= List of equestrian statues =

This is a list of notable equestrian statues by country. The sculptures are listed by the date of their inauguration, regardless whether they were later dismantled or torn down.

== Albania ==
Image	Portrayed person	Location	Date	Sculptor	Coordinates	Note
	Skanderbeg	Rruga Kala, Krujë	1949-1959	Janaq Paço	41.510916°N 19.792503°E	The first equestrian statue in Albania; see Skanderbeg Monument
	Skanderbeg	Skanderbeg Square, Tirana	1968	Odhise Paskalit, Andrea Mano, Janaq Paço	41.327624°N 19.818612°E	Erected on the 500th anniversary of the death of the national hero

== Algeria ==
Image	Portrayed person	Location	Date	Sculptor	Coordinates	Note
	Ferdinand Philippe, Duke of Orléans	place du Gouvernement, Algiers	1842-1845	Carlo Marochetti	36.784783°N 3.062789°E	Dismantled after the independence of Algeria in 1963, and moved to France where it was inaugurated in Neuilly-sur-Seine in 1981
	Jeanne d'Arc	place Jeanne d'Arc, Oran	1931	Joseph Ebstein	35.700235°N 0.646321°W	Dismantled after the independence of Algeria in 1962, and moved to France where it was inaugurated in Caen in 1964 on a new plinth
	Jeanne d'Arc	square Laferrière, Algiers	1937-1951	Georges Halbout du Tanney	36.773096°N 3.059435°E	Knocked down after the independence of Algeria on 3 August 1962, and moved to France where it was restored, and inaugurated in Vaucouleurs in 1966
	Abdelkader al-Jazairi	place des Martyrs, Mascara	1968		35.394785°N 0.140891°E	First equestrian statue of the emir, moved to Mascara from Algiers in 1983, originally on place de l'Émir Abdelkader, moved again in 2004; the plinth replaced two times
	Abdelkader al-Jazairi	place de l'Émir-Abdelkader, Algiers	1987	Marian Konieczny	36.776228°N 3.058461°E	Replaced a previous statue of the hero which had been installed in 1968

== Argentina ==
=== Buenos Aires ===
Image	Portrayed person	Location	Date	Sculptor	Coordinates	Note
	José de San Martín	Plaza San Martín, Retiro	1862, 1909-1910	Louis-Joseph Daumas, Gustav Eberlein	34.595000°S 58.377111°W	The first equestrian statue in Argentina; a new red granite plinth, allegorical figures and reliefs were added in 1910
	Manuel Belgrano	Plaza de Mayo, Monserrat	1870-1873	Louis-Robert Carrier-Belleuse, Manuel de Santa Coloma	34.6084°S 58.3712°W	The pedestal was replaced in 1885 by a higher, pink Salto granite plinth; see Equestrian monument to General Manuel Belgrano
	Giuseppe Garibaldi	Plaza Italia, Palermo	1898-1904	Eugenio Maccagnani	34.5814°S 58.4209°W	Replica of a statue in Brescia, the granite plinth is decorated with allegorical bronze statues and reliefs; see Monument to Giuseppe Garibaldi
	Bernardo O'Higgins	Plaza República de Chile, Palermo	1916-1918	Guillermo Córdova	34.58162°S 58.40024°W	Originally on Plaza Rodríguez Peña, transferred to its present location in 1949; the pedestal is decorated with bronze reliefs and an allegorical statue
	Manuel Dorrego	Plaza Suipacha, San Nicolás	1907-1926	Rogelio Yrurtia	34.600272°S 58.379622°W	Located on top of a gray granite pedestal decorated with two allegorical statues
	Carlos María de Alvear	Avenida Alvear, Recoleta	1914-1926	Antoine Bourdelle, Alejandro Bustillo (pedestal)	34.585374°S 58.389823°W	Located on top of a 13 m high pedestal clad with red granite and decorated with four allegorical statues; see Monument to General Carlos M. de Alvear
	Bartolomé Mitre	Plaza Mitre, Recoleta	1907-1927	Davide Calandra, Edoardo Rubino	34.584375°S 58.396218°W	The bronze statue stands on a granite pedestal surrounded by allegorical sculptures of Carrara marble, see Monument to Bartolomé Mitre
	A gaucho herdsman (El Resero)	In the forecourt of Mercado de Liniers, Mataderos	1929-1934	Emilio Sarniguet	34.662448°S 58.500095°W	A symbol of the former slaughterhouse district, placed on a pedestal in 1948. Depicted on the 10 peso coins in 1962
	El Cid	Avenida Gaona, Caballito	1935	Anna Hyatt Huntington	34.607498°S 58.445621°W	Copy of the statue of Cid Campeador in Seville (1927), donation of the Hispanic Society of America
	Julio Argentino Roca	Avenida Presidente Julio Argentino Roca, Montserrat	1935-1941	José Luis Zorrilla de San Martín, Alejandro Bustillo (pedestal)	34.610339°S 58.374909°W	The bronze statue is set on a 14 m high pedestal clad with red granite and decorated with two allegorical bronze statues
	Simón Bolívar	Parque Rivadavia, Caballito	1942	José Fioravanti	34.617697°S 58.432807°W	Complete with a white marble triumphal arch and two allegorical figures
	Justo José de Urquiza	Avenida Sarmiento, Palermo	1958	Vittorio Renzo Baldi, Héctor Rocha	34.57158°S 58.41183°W	The pedestal is decorated with bronze reliefs and an allegorical statue
	Martín Miguel de Güemes	Parque San Benito, Belgrano	1981	Ermando Bucci	34.550979°S 58.435701°W	Perched on a pyramidal stone base; inspired by the Monument of Güemes in Salta
	A mounted policeman	Avenida Presidente Figueroa Alcorta, Palermo	1996		34.574935°S 58.406385°W	Modern statue in front of the headquarters of the Mounted Police
	Juan Manuel de Rosas	Plaza Intendente Seeber, Palermo	1996-1999	Ricardo Dalla Lasta	34.575311°S 58.416281°W	Classical bronze statue on an 8 m high pedestal

=== Buenos Aires (province) ===
Image	Portrayed person	Location	Date	Sculptor	Coordinates	Note
	José de San Martín	Parque de Mayo, Bahía Blanca	1910	Louis-Joseph Daumas, Gregorio Salamandekov (architect)	38.695280°S 62.268313°W	Copy of the famous statue in Buenos Aires, the first public monument in the city of Bahía Blanca
	José de San Martín	Plaza Independencia, Chascomús	1910-1912	Louis-Joseph Daumas	35.579016°S 58.013782°W	Copy of the famous statue in Buenos Aires on a white stone pedestal, decorated with bronze ornaments
	José de San Martín	Plaza San Martín, La Plata	1914	Henri Allouard	34.915315°S 57.947853°W	Copy of a statue in Boulogne-sur-Mer, the granite pedestal is decorated with an allegorical bronze statue and trophies
	José de San Martín	Plaza San Martín, Ciudad de San Martín	1911-1915	Josep Cardona	34.577282°S 58.537631°W	Placed on a pedestal of natural rocks and accompanied by an allegorical bronze statue
	Martín Rodríguez	Parque Independencia, Tandil	1923	Arturo Dresco	37.340365°S 59.137288°W	Statue of the town's founder on a pedestal of natural rocks, located on the top of a landscaped hill
	Manuel Belgrano	Plaza Belgrano, Luján	1929-1930	Luis Bruninx	34.563357°S 59.120941°W	The stone pedestal is decorated with two bronze reliefs and the coat-of-arms of Argentina
	José de San Martín	Avenida San Martín, San Carlos de Bolívar	1935	Louis-Joseph Daumas	36.230300°S 61.114370°W	Copy of the famous statue in Buenos Aires on a granite pedestal which is decorated with a bronze wreath
	José de San Martín	Plaza San Martín, Bragado	1938	Louis-Joseph Daumas	35.113002°S 60.490090°W	Copy of the famous statue in Buenos Aires on a high modern pedestal
	José de San Martín	Plaza General San Martín, Azul	1935-1939	Louis-Joseph Daumas, Francisco Salamone (architect)	36.777558°S 59.863478°W	Copy of the famous statue in Buenos Aires placed on a large modern pedestal which serves as a fountain
	José de San Martín	Plaza 25 de Mayo, Junín	1940	Louis-Joseph Daumas	34.593926°S 60.946424°W	Copy of the famous statue in Buenos Aires placed on a large modern pedestal, clad in red granite
	José de San Martín	Plaza San Martín, San Justo	1941-1944	Santiago Chierico	34.677624°S 58.561180°W	The pedestal is decorated with a bronze condor, two reliefs and the Medal for Battle of Bailén
	José de San Martín	Plaza Grigera, Lomas de Zamora	1944-1946	Ángel Eusebio Ibarra García	34.757068°S 58.402612°W	Placed on a pyramidal plinth, clad in white marble
	José de San Martín	Plaza San Martín, Quilmes	1946	Antonio Sassone	34.720049°S 58.254354°W	Replaced by a Daumas copy in 1950 but returned to its original place in 1965; the marble clad pedestal is decorated with allegorical sculpture groups and bronze reliefs
	José de San Martín	Plaza San Martín, Trenque Lauquen	1950-1952	Pedro Biscardi	35.973369°S 62.732493°W	Originally placed on top of a high modern pedestal, flanked by two allegorical bronze statues; in 2021 the three sculptures were moved to a new location nearby, and reinstalled as part of a decorative fountain
	José de San Martín	Parque San Martín, Punta Alta	1950-1952	Louis-Joseph Daumas	38.870420°S 62.072409°W	Copy of the famous statue in Buenos Aires placed on a modern pedestal with a large stepped platform
	José de San Martín	Plaza San Martín, Tres Arroyos	1952	Louis-Joseph Daumas, Antonio Orfano (pedestal)	38.377229°S 60.275137°W	Copy of the famous statue in Buenos Aires placed on a large modern pedestal clad with slabs of grey punilla marble
	José de San Martín	Plaza San Martín, Rojas	1953	Louis-Joseph Daumas	34.197756°S 60.733687°W	Copy of the famous statue in Buenos Aires placed on a large modern pedestal clad with red and grey marble slabs
	José de San Martín	Plaza San Martín, Chacabuco	1954	Louis-Joseph Daumas	34.642039°S 60.471241°W	Copy of the famous statue in Buenos Aires as part of an imposing monument with several bronze statues, reliefs and a large pedestal clad with polished red marble slabs
	José de San Martín	Plaza San Martín, Mercedes	1954	Juan José Marín	34.650695°S 59.431332°W	An allegorical bronze statue of Freedom stands in front of the stone-clad plinth
	José de San Martín	Plazoleta Alejandro Maria Aguado, Olavarría	1956-1958	Louis-Joseph Daumas, Ricardo Dagá (Liberty)	36.894216°S 60.330070°W	Copy of the famous statue in Buenos Aires on a high pedestal of rough-hewn stone decorated with the statue of Liberty
	José de San Martín	Plaza San Martín, Berazategui	1966	Louis-Joseph Daumas, Juan Carlos Farina	34.753861°S 58.214402°W	Originally stood on Plaza San Martín in Quilmes from 1953 and removed in 1965. Moved to Berazategui in 1966. Copy of the famous statue in Buenos Aires placed on a large modern pedestal in the middle of a fountain; two bronze statues added
	José de San Martín	Parque San Martín, Mar del Plata	1969-1972	Louis-Joseph Daumas	38.023903°S 57.529118°W	Copy of the famous statue in Buenos Aires placed on a large pedestal of natural rocks
	Don Quixote	Plaza España, Mar del Plata	1972-1975	Hidelberg Ferrino	37.991690°S 57.545562°W	The Cervantes Monument features an equestrian statue of Don Quixote; it was erected on the centenary of the foundation of Mar del Plata
	José de San Martín	Parque San Martín, San Nicolás de los Arroyos	1979	Louis-Joseph Daumas	33.331262°S 60.207758°W	Copy of the famous statue in Buenos Aires; the modern pedestal was replaced in 2018
	José de San Martín	Plaza San Martín, Don Torcuato	1998	Louis-Joseph Daumas	34.500281°S 58.621321°W	Copy of the famous statue in Buenos Aires on a high modern pedestal

=== Catamarca ===
Image	Portrayed person	Location	Date	Sculptor	Coordinates	Note
	José de San Martín	Plaza 25 de Mayo, San Fernando del Valle de Catamarca	1915	Louis-Joseph Daumas	28.469009°S 65.779003°W	Copy of the famous statue in Buenos Aires placed on a Neo-Classical granite pedestal decorated with bronze reliefs

=== Chaco ===
Image	Portrayed person	Location	Date	Sculptor	Coordinates	Note
	José de San Martín	Plaza 25 de Mayo, Resistencia	1942-1945	Louis-Joseph Daumas, Raúl Lizárraga (architect)	27.451177°S 58.986503°W	Copy of the famous statue in Buenos Aires placed on a high stone pedestal
	José de San Martín	Plaza San Martín, Presidencia Roque Sáenz Peña	1950	Louis-Joseph Daumas	26.790959°S 60.441224°W	Copy of the famous statue in Buenos Aires on an Art Deco pedestal clad with black marble slabs

=== Chubut ===
Image	Portrayed person	Location	Date	Sculptor	Coordinates	Note
	José de San Martín	Plaza San Martín, Comodoro Rivadavia	1941	Louis-Joseph Daumas	45.865287°S 67.482036°W	Copy of the famous statue in Buenos Aires, moved to its present location from the seaside in 1961; high modern pedestal which also serves as a storage shed

=== Córdoba ===
Image	Portrayed person	Location	Date	Sculptor	Coordinates	Note
	José María Paz	Parque Autóctono, Córdoba	1877-1887	Alexandre Falguière, Paul Pujol (architect)	31.382589°S 64.224301°W	The oldest commemorative monument in Córdoba, originally located on Plaza General Paz, relocated in 1971 to the park which was the scene of the Battle of La Tablada
	José de San Martín	Plaza San Martín, Córdoba	1910-1916	Louis-Joseph Daumas, Luis Fontana, José Scarabelli, Atilio Locatti (architect)	31.416729°S 64.183585°W	Copy of the famous statue in Buenos Aires, the gray Las Peñas granite pedestal is decorated with bronze reliefs
	José de San Martín	Plaza San Martín, Río Cuarto	1931	Louis-Joseph Daumas	33.116917°S 64.347479°W	Copy of the famous statue in Buenos Aires on a high pedestal, surrounded with allegorical statues by Libero Pierini from 1957. The original pedestal was lower
	José de San Martín	Plaza 25 de Mayo, Bell Ville	1938	Louis-Joseph Daumas	32.630303°S 62.688968°W	Copy of the famous statue in Buenos Aires on a high modern pedestal which serves as a fountain
	José de San Martín	Plaza San Martín, Monte Maíz	1952	Louis-Joseph Daumas	33.204342°S 62.600556°W	Copy of the famous statue in Buenos Aires on a high Neoclassical pedestal
	José de San Martín	Plaza San Martín, Río Tercero	1948-1956	Louis-Joseph Daumas, Pietro Gaudenzio Sacchetti (architect)	32.176717°S 64.112963°W	Copy of the famous statue in Buenos Aires on a high pedestal decorated with the national coat-of-arms, a torch and a sabre
	José de San Martín	Plaza Cívica, San Francisco	1962	Louis-Joseph Daumas	31.430048°S 62.085116°W	Copy of the famous statue in Buenos Aires on a high modern pedestal clad with white marble
	José de San Martín	at Puente Alberdi, Villa María	1967	Louis-Joseph Daumas, Carlos Alonso (architect)	32.420821°S 63.244846°W	Copy of the famous statue in Buenos Aires on a high modern pedestal clad with white marble; erected on the centenary of the city
	José de San Martín	Avenida del Libertador General San Martín, Alta Gracia	1968	Louis-Joseph Daumas	31.658586°S 64.425497°W	Copy of the famous statue in Buenos Aires on a high modern pedestal clad with white marble

=== Corrientes ===
Image	Portrayed person	Location	Date	Sculptor	Coordinates	Note
	José de San Martín	Plaza 25 de Mayo, Corrientes	1905	Louis-Joseph Daumas, Torquat Tasso (pedestal)	27.463361°S 58.839535°W	Copy of the famous statue in Buenos Aires, placed on a monumental granite pedestal decorated with bronze reliefs, columns and rocks

=== Entre Ríos ===
Image	Portrayed person	Location	Date	Sculptor	Coordinates	Note
	José de San Martín	Plaza 1 de Mayo, Paraná	1910	Louis-Joseph Daumas	31.733018°S 60.529790°W	Copy of the famous statue in Buenos Aires; a bronze statue of a soldier stands in front of the stone-clad plinth
	José de San Martín	Plaza San Martín, Victoria	1910	Louis-Joseph Daumas	32.621619°S 60.158001°W	Copy of the famous statue in Buenos Aires on a marble-clad plinth
	José de San Martín	Plaza 25 de Mayo, Concordia	1910	Louis-Joseph Daumas	31.397495°S 58.017211°W	Copy of the famous statue in Buenos Aires placed on a Classical stone pedestal decorated with reliefs and plaques
	José de San Martín	Plaza San Martín, Concepción del Uruguay	1910	Louis-Joseph Daumas	32.480231°S 58.234238°W	Copy of the famous statue in Buenos Aires on a marble-clad plinth
	José de San Martín	Plaza San Martín, Gualeguay	1910	Louis-Joseph Daumas	33.141007°S 59.312672°W	Copy of the famous statue in Buenos Aires on a pedestal decorated with a wreath
	José de San Martín	Plaza San Martín, Gualeguaychú	1910	Louis-Joseph Daumas, Antonio Soatti (pedestal)	33.007865°S 58.510958°W	Copy of the famous statue in Buenos Aires; the Classical pedestal was partially encased in natural rocks and decorated with the statue of a condor
	Justo José de Urquiza	Parque Urquiza, Paraná	1908-1920	Agustí Querol Subirats (pedestal), Mariano Benlliure (equestrian statue)	31.718078°S 60.537848°W	The high pedestal is decorated with Art Nouveau allegorical statues and reliefs made of marble and bronze
	José de San Martín	Plaza San Martín, Colón	1929	Louis-Joseph Daumas	32.218592°S 58.135290°W	Copy of the famous statue in Buenos Aires placed on an Art Deco pedestal clad with grey granite, the front is decorated with a bronze relief

=== Formosa ===
Image	Portrayed person	Location	Date	Sculptor	Coordinates	Note
	José de San Martín	Plaza San Martín, Formosa	1913	Louis-Joseph Daumas, José Garzia (architect)	26.184906°S 58.173417°W	Copy of the famous statue in Buenos Aires on a Neo-Classical granite pedestal decorated with reliefs

=== Jujuy ===
Image	Portrayed person	Location	Date	Sculptor	Coordinates	Note
	José de San Martín	Parque San Martín, San Salvador de Jujuy	1915	Louis-Joseph Daumas	24.185784°S 65.299481°W	Copy of the famous statue in Buenos Aires on a Neo-Classical pedestal
	Manuel Belgrano	Plaza Belgrano, San Salvador de Jujuy	1906-1931	Víctor José Garino	24.182772°S 65.314875°W	The granite pedestal is decorated with two bronze reliefs

=== La Pampa ===
Image	Portrayed person	Location	Date	Sculptor	Coordinates	Note
	José de San Martín	Plaza San Martín, Santa Rosa	1942	Louis-Joseph Daumas	36.620384°S 64.290554°W	Copy of the famous statue in Buenos Aires; the plinth is clad with Sierra Chica red granite slabs and decorated with bronze reliefs
	José de San Martín	Plaza San Martín, General Pico	1958	Louis-Joseph Daumas	35.658636°S 63.757175°W	Copy of the famous statue in Buenos Aires on a modern plinth located in the middle of a fountain

=== La Rioja ===
Image	Portrayed person	Location	Date	Sculptor	Coordinates	Note
	José de San Martín	Plaza 25 de Mayo, La Rioja	1915	Louis-Joseph Daumas	29.412844°S 66.855889°W	Copy of the famous statue in Buenos Aires; the plinth is decorated with bronze ornaments

=== Mendoza ===
Image	Portrayed person	Location	Date	Sculptor	Coordinates	Note
	José de San Martín	Plaza San Martín, Mendoza	1904	Louis-Joseph Daumas, Abelardo Tabanera (pedestal)	32.887643°S 68.840608°W	Copy of the famous statue in Buenos Aires, placed on a pedestal of granite rocks from the Andes
	José de San Martín	Cerro de la Gloria, Mendoza	1911-1914	Juan Manuel Ferrari	32.888797°S 68.891183°W	The Monument to the Army of the Andes features an allegorical representation of Freedom and an equestrian statue of San Martin, with bronze reliefs around a base of rocks
	José de San Martín	Plaza San Martín, San Rafael	1928	Louis-Joseph Daumas	34.612910°S 68.330485°W	Copy of the famous statue in Buenos Aires, placed on a pedestal of rough-hewn rhyolite blocks
	José de San Martín	Plaza San Martín, San Martín	1940	Louis-Joseph Daumas	33.080391°S 68.470524°W	Copy of the famous statue in Buenos Aires, placed on a pedestal of rough-hewn blocks
	José de San Martín	El Manzano Histórico, Tunuyán	1949-1950	Luis Perlotti	33.603617°S 69.383527°W	The Return to the Motherland Monument features a statue of San Martín on the back of a mule and wearing a poncho

=== Misiones ===
Image	Portrayed person	Location	Date	Sculptor	Coordinates	Note
	José de San Martín	Plaza San Martín, Posadas	1932-1934	Louis-Joseph Daumas, Alejandro Bustillo (architect)	27.368873°S 55.897559°W	Copy of the famous statue in Buenos Aires, placed on a high pedestal clad with stone slabs

=== Neuquén ===
Image	Portrayed person	Location	Date	Sculptor	Coordinates	Note
	José de San Martín	Plaza San Martín, San Martín de los Andes	1948-50	Santiago José Chierico	40.156872°S 71.352577°W	On a simple stone pedestal which has a base of natural rocks
	José de San Martín	Avenida Argentina, Neuquén	1953-54	Louis-Joseph Daumas, José Antonio Alonso	38.951781°S 68.059071°W	Copy of the famous statue in Buenos Aires, placed on a high modern pedestal. The original classical plinth was clad with limestone but this was replaced in 2014. See San Martín Monument, Neuquén

=== Río Negro ===
Image	Portrayed person	Location	Date	Sculptor	Coordinates	Note
	Julio Argentino Roca	Centro Cívico, Bariloche	1941	Emilio Sarniguet, Alejandro Bustillo (pedestal)	41.133512°S 71.310144°W	Placed on a pedestal of rough stone blocks
	José de San Martín	Plaza San Martín, Viedma	1971	Louis-Joseph Daumas	40.808447°S 62.994721°W	Copy of the famous statue in Buenos Aires on a modern granite pedestal

=== Salta ===
Image	Portrayed person	Location	Date	Sculptor	Coordinates	Note
	José de San Martín	Parque San Martín, Salta	1912-1913	Louis-Joseph Daumas	24.794805°S 65.401134°W	Copy of the famous statue in Buenos Aires on an austere Art Deco pedestal
	Juan Antonio Álvarez de Arenales	Plaza 9 de Julio, Salta	1919	Arturo Dresco	24.789228°S 65.410283°W	The pedestal is decorated with allegorical bronze figures symbolizing the United Provinces of the Río de la Plata and the Nation
	Martín Miguel de Güemes	Paseo Güemes, Salta	1920-31	Víctor Juan Garino, Andrés Iñigo (architect)	24.786731°S 65.399247°W	Erected on the spot where the wounded general fell from his horse. The pedestal is built of rocks from Cerro San Bernardo and decorated with bronze reliefs

=== San Juan ===
Image	Portrayed person	Location	Date	Sculptor	Coordinates	Note
	José de San Martín	Parque de Mayo, San Juan	1916	Louis-Joseph Daumas	31.535175°S 68.540328°W	Copy of the famous statue in Buenos Aires on simple stone pedestal

=== San Luis ===
Image	Portrayed person	Location	Date	Sculptor	Coordinates	Note
	Juan Pascual Pringles	Plaza Pringles, San Luis	1911-1912	Rafael Radogna	33.302070°S 66.336980°W	The gray granite pedestal is decorated with bronze reliefs and ornaments
	José de San Martín	Plaza Independencia, San Luis	1914-1916	Louis-Joseph Daumas	33.307430°S 66.335455°W	Copy of the famous statue in Buenos Aires on a Neo-Classical pedestal clad with German granite slabs
	José de San Martín	Plaza San Martín, Villa Mercedes	1945	Louis-Joseph Daumas	33.674414°S 65.462323°W	Copy of the famous statue in Buenos Aires on a large pedestal of natural rocks

=== Santa Cruz ===
Image	Portrayed person	Location	Date	Sculptor	Coordinates	Note
	José de San Martín	Plaza San Martín, Río Gallegos	1950-1954	Louis-Joseph Daumas	51.623357°S 69.215982°W	Copy of the famous statue in Buenos Aires on a pedestal of red Puerto Deseado porphyry blocks decorated with the bronze statue of a condor and reliefs

=== Santa Fe ===
Image	Portrayed person	Location	Date	Sculptor	Coordinates	Note
	José de San Martín	Plaza San Martín, Santa Fe	1902	Louis-Joseph Daumas, Torquat Tasso (pedestal)	31.646609°S 60.709960°W	The first copy of the famous statue in a provincial capital; the Andean granite pedestal imitates a natural rock, and it is decorated with reliefs and bronze ornaments in a whimsical style
	José de San Martín	Plaza San Martín, Rosario	1911-13	Henri Allouard	32.943669°S 60.649714°W	Copy of a statue in Boulogne-sur-Mer, the gray granite pedestal is decorated with bronze reliefs
	Manuel Belgrano	Bulevar Oroño, Rosario	1922-1928	Arnoldo Zocchi	32.958183°S 60.656925°W	Gift of the Italian Argentine community to the city; mounted on a polished red Sierra Chica granite pedestal
	José de San Martín	Plaza 25 de Mayo, Rafaela	1950	Louis-Joseph Daumas	31.252717°S 61.491749°W	Copy of the famous statue in Buenos Aires; the stone pedestal is decorated with a large 1952 bronze relief on one side
	José de San Martín	Plaza San Martín, Venado Tuerto	1951-1953	Louis-Joseph Daumas, Juan José Monti (architect)	33.745482°S 61.968674°W	Copy of the famous statue in Buenos Aires on high modern pedestal clad with marble slabs
	José de San Martín	Plaza San Martín, Casilda	1950-1953	Louis-Joseph Daumas, Paulino Lóttici (architect)	33.044634°S 61.172455°W	Copy of the famous statue in Buenos Aires on high classical pedestal clad with stone slabs

=== Santiago del Estero ===
Image	Portrayed person	Location	Date	Sculptor	Coordinates	Note
	Manuel Belgrano	Plaza Libertad, Santiago del Estero	1912	Arturo Tomagnini	27.783333°S 64.266667°W	The stone pedestal is decorated with three bronze reliefs and allegorical statues

=== Tucumán ===
Image	Portrayed person	Location	Date	Sculptor	Coordinates	Note
	José de San Martín	Plaza San Martín, San Miguel de Tucumán	1910	Louis-Joseph Daumas	26.839023°S 65.210663°W	Copy of the famous statue in Buenos Aires on a Neo-Classical pedestal decorated with a bronze relief and plaques

== Armenia ==
Image	Portrayed person	Location	Date	Sculptor	Coordinates	Note
	David of Sassoun	Sasuntsi Davit Square, Yerevan	1957-1959	Yervand Kochar, Mikael Mazmanyan (architect)	40.155268°N 44.509451°E	The copper statue of the folk hero stands on a pedestal of basalt rocks, its first version was created in 1939 and destroyed in 1941; it is a popular symbol of Yerevan
	Vardan Mamikonian	Circular Park, Yerevan	1975	Yervand Kochar, Stepan Kyurkchyan (architect)	40.174162°N 44.520657°E	Expressive wrought copper statue of the national hero on a large modern pedestal of red sandstone
	Hayk Bzhishkyan	Nansen Park, Yerevan	1974-1977	Suren Nazaryan, Sarkis Gurzadyan (architect)	40.200212°N 44.565569°E	Expressive bronze statue of the Soviet military commander of Armenian origin on a tall basalt pedestal; the memorial complex also has a fifty meter long basalt wall decorated with reliefs
	Davit Bek	Near the Voghji river, Kapan	1983	Sargis Baghdasaryan, Varuzhan Sahakyan (architect)	39.209200°N 46.406206°E	Expressive wrought copper statue of the Armenian military commander on a tall stone pedestal; the central memorial is flanked by long walls decorated with reliefs
	Andranik Ozanian	Zoravar Andranik Square, Gyumri	1989	Gabriel Yeproyan	40.781060°N 43.844650°E	Modern bronze statue of the hero of the Armenian Liberation on a granite pedestal
	Andranik Ozanian	On a hill near Navur	1989-1990	Sargis Ayvazyan		Copper statue of the hero of the Armenian Liberation on a pedestal of rocks; originally intended for Yerevan
	Andranik Ozanian	In front of Saint Gregory Cathedral, Yerevan	2002	Ara Shiraz, Aslan Mkhitaryan (architect)	40.172380°N 44.514730°E	Modern bronze statue of the hero of the Armenian Liberation riding two horses
	Ivan Bagramian	Marshal Bagramyan Avenue, Yerevan	2003	Norayr Karganyan, Eduard Arevshatyan (architect)	40.192000°N 44.504400°E	Modern bronze statue of the a Soviet military commander of Armenian origin on a granite pedestal decorated with bronze reliefs
	Vardan Mamikonian	Vartanants Square, Gyumri	2008	Artush Papoyan	40.785270°N 43.841580°E	Modern bronze statue in the center of a group of historic Armenian figures who led a campaign against Sassanid Persia
	Ashot III of Armenia	Gorki Street, Gyumri	2008	Ferdinant Arakelyan, Norik Manukyan (architect)	40.787348°N 43.846694°E	Modern bronze statue of the medieval Armenian king
	Ashot II of Armenia	Constitution Square, Ijevan	2017	Armen Davtyan		Modern bronze statue of the medieval Armenian king on a pedestal of natural rock

== Aruba ==
Image	Portrayed person	Location	Date	Sculptor	Coordinates	Note
	Simón Bolívar	Plaza Simon Bolivar, Oranjestad		Adamo Tadolini	12.510429°N 70.027843°W	Copy of the famous statue of the Libertador in Caracas and Lima; gift of the Venezuelan government

== Australia ==
=== Australian Capital Territory ===
Image	Portrayed person	Location	Date	Sculptor	Coordinates	Note
	Mounted soldiers of the Australian and New Zealand Desert Mounted Corps	Anzac Parade, Canberra	1968	Bertram Mackennal	35.287408°S 149.142175°E	Copy of a destroyed 1932 memorial of ANZAC soldiers in Port Said; see Mounted Memorial, Canberra
	Australian soldiers of the Second Boer War	Anzac Parade, Canberra	2017	Louis Laumen	35.288344°S 149.141535°E	Bronze statues of four mounted riflemen on patrol on the South African veldt as part of a memorial complex; see Boer War Memorial, Canberra

=== New South Wales ===
Image	Portrayed person	Location	Date	Sculptor	Coordinates	Note
	Edward VII	Corner of Macquarie and Bridge Streets, Sydney	1922	Thomas Brock	33.863194°S 151.213143°E	On a sandstone plinth with bronze relief panels showing allegorical figures
	The Offerings of Peace	In front of the Art Gallery of New South Wales, Sydney	1916-1926	Gilbert Bayes	33.868362°S 151.217122°E	Allegorical statue on a simple sandstone plinth
	The Offerings of War	In front of the Art Gallery of New South Wales, Sydney	1916-1926	Gilbert Bayes	33.868720°S 151.216746°E	Allegorical statue on a simple sandstone plinth
	Bushranger Govett	Neate Park, Blackheath	1976	Arthur Murch	33.637138°S 150.284915°E	Statue of the mythical figure made of resin and marble dust
	Dorothea Mackellar	South Street, Gunnedah	1983	Dennis Adams	30.982691°S 150.253701°E	Statue of the poet watering her horse
	Captain Thunderbolt	Bridge Street, Uralla	1988	Dennis Adams	30.642503°S 151.499125°E	Statue of the infamous bushranger near Uralla Creek erected as a bicentenary project

=== Queensland ===
Image	Portrayed person	Location	Date	Sculptor	Coordinates	Note
	Queensland Mounted Infantryman from the Second Boer War	Anzac Square, Brisbane	1912-1919	James Laurence Watts	27.466739°S 153.026872°E	Originally stood near the intersection of Turbot and Edward Streets, relocated to the square in 1939. Trachyte pedestal with large bronze plaques containing the names of Queensland soldiers who lost their lives in the conflict.
	King George V	King George Square, Brisbane	1938	Edward Frederick Kohler	27.4681929°S 153.023711°E	Originally part of a monumental memorial designed by Reginald Summerhayes with a high sandstone plinth, two lion statues and terraces; now placed on a modern pedestal. The memorial was dismantled in 1969.
	Andrew Petrie	King George Square, Brisbane	1988	Stephen Walker	27.468285°S 153.023826°E	The sculpture group shows the founder of the city on horseback with his family; the original stone pedestal was replaced in 2007

=== South Australia ===
Image	Portrayed person	Location	Date	Sculptor	Coordinates	Note
	Amazon fighting a panther	Adelaide Botanic Garden, Adelaide	1867	August Kiss	34.918102°S 138.610402°E	Reduced copy of the original statue at the Altes Museum in Berlin.
	South Australian Mounted Infantryman from the Second Boer War	North Terrace, Adelaide	1904	Adrian Jones	34.921514°S 138.599461°E	The first commemorative equestrian statue in Australia; granite pedestal with bronze plaques containing the names of soldiers who lost their lives in the conflict. See South African War Memorial
	King George V	Sir Edwin Smith Avenue, Adelaide	1938-1950	Maurice Lambert	34.914810°S 138.600063°E	On a pedestal of Waikerie freestone and granite designed by Woods, Bagot, Laybourne Smith and Irwin which is decorated with the royal coat of arms.
	Rodeo rider	Marrabel Rodeo Grounds, Marrabel	1991	Ben Van Zetten	34.140873°S 138.878071°E	Memorial to a famous horse, Curio ridden by Alan Wood for the first time in 1953.

=== Victoria ===
Image	Portrayed person	Location	Date	Sculptor	Coordinates	Note
	Saint George and the dragon	State Library Forecourt, Melbourne	1888	Joseph Edgar Boehm	37.809863°S 144.964460°E	Bought following the Centennial International Exhibition, installed on a classical stone pedestal in 1889.
	Sergeant James Rogers rescuing a British soldier	Sturt Street, Ballarat	1901-1906	James White	37.561895°S 143.857204°E	The bronze plaques on the stone pedestal list the names of Victorian soldiers fallen in the Second Boer War.
	Jeanne d'Arc	State Library Forecourt, Melbourne	1907	Emmanuel Frémiet	37.810081°S 144.964556°E	Copy of the famous statue in Paris installed on a classical stone pedestal.
	John Hope, 7th Earl of Hopetoun	St Kilda Road, Melbourne	1908-1911	William Birnie Rhind	37.826659°S 144.971922°E	Statue of the first Governor-General of Australia on a granite pedestal.
	King Edward VII	Queen Victoria Gardens, Melbourne	1910-1920	Edgar Bertram Mackennal	37.822657°S 144.970954°E	Part of a larger monument with basalt and granite pedestal, a semi-circular alcove and a paved bluestone terrace.
	Sir John Monash	Birdwood Avenue, Melbourne	1950	William Leslie Bowles	37.826794°S 144.972777°E	Statue of the Australian general on a simple granite plinth.
	The Man from Snowy River	Hanson Street, Corryong	2010	Brett Garling	36.195530°S 147.904233°E	A local man, Jack Riley is believed to be the inspiration for A.B. "Banjo" Paterson's famous poem "The Man from Snowy River".
	Jockey riding Black Caviar	High Street, Nagambie	2013	Mitch Mitchell	36.786022°S 145.152895°E	The sculpture commemorates the race horse, Black Caviar who was born in Nagambie.

=== Western Australia ===
Image	Portrayed person	Location	Date	Sculptor	Coordinates	Note
	Mounted soldiers of the Australian and New Zealand Desert Mounted Corps	Mount Clarence, Albany	1964	Bertram Mackennal	35.025352°S 117.896037°E	Copy of a destroyed 1932 memorial of ANZAC soldiers in Port Said; placed on the restored granite plinth.

== Austria ==
=== Vienna ===
Image	Portrayed person	Location	Date	Sculptor	Coordinates	Note
	Emperor Francis I	Burggarten, Vienna	1781	Balthasar Ferdinand Moll	48.204503°N 16.365211°E	Oldest equestrian statue in Vienna; originally erected in the Paradeisgartl, moved to its present location in 1819, and placed on a new stone pedestal.
	Emperor Joseph II	Josefsplatz, Vienna	1795-1807	Franz Anton von Zauner	48.206448°N 16.367198°E	Modelled after the equestrian statue of Marcus Aurelius in Rome; the polished Mauthausen granite pedestal is decorated with bronze reliefs and plaques; the monument is surrounded by a chained enclosure.
	Emperor Joseph II	Schlosspark Schönbrunn, Vienna	1795-1810	Franz Anton von Zauner	48.184138°N 16.301272°E	Scale-down model of the monument on Josefsplatz.
	Archduke Karl	Heldenplatz, Vienna	1853-1860	Anton Dominik Fernkorn, Eduard van der Nüll (architect)	48.206594°N 16.363378°E	One of the few equestrian statue in the world with only two support points. The stone plinth is decorated with bronze reliefs and plaques.
	Prince Eugene of Savoy	Heldenplatz, Vienna	1860-1865	Anton Dominik Fernkorn, Franz Pönninger, Eduard van der Nüll (architect)	48.206065°N 16.364129°E	Counterpart of the monument of Archduke Karl; the Untersberg marble plinth is decorated with bronze reliefs and plaques.
	Karl Philipp, Prince of Schwarzenberg	Schwarzenbergplatz, Vienna	1863-1867	Ernst Julius Hähnel	48.200891°N 16.374673°E	On a stone pedestal, surrounded by a chained enclosure.
	Harmonia	On the rooftop of the Vienna State Opera, Vienna	1876	Ernst Julius Hähnel	48.203000°N 16.369111°E	One of a pair of allegorical statues riding winged horses; the stone pedestal is decorated with festoons and ribbons.
	Erato	On the rooftop of the Vienna State Opera, Vienna	1876	Ernst Julius Hähnel	48.203000°N 16.369111°E	One of a pair of allegorical statues riding winged horses; the stone pedestal is decorated with festoons and ribbons.
	Field marshal Ernst Gideon von Laudon	Maria-Theresien-Platz, Vienna	1875-1888	Kaspar von Zumbusch	48.204456°N 16.360772°E	Part of the large-scale monument of Empress Maria Theresa
	Field marshal Leopold Joseph von Daun	Maria-Theresien-Platz, Vienna	1875-1888	Kaspar von Zumbusch	48.204456°N 16.360772°E	Part of the large-scale monument of Empress Maria Theresa
	Field marshal Otto Ferdinand von Abensperg und Traun	Maria-Theresien-Platz, Vienna	1875-1888	Kaspar von Zumbusch	48.204456°N 16.360772°E	Part of the large-scale monument of Empress Maria Theresa
	Field marshal Ludwig Andreas von Khevenhüller	Maria-Theresien-Platz, Vienna	1875-1888	Kaspar von Zumbusch	48.204456°N 16.360772°E	Part of the large-scale monument of Empress Maria Theresa
	Field marshal Joseph Radetzky von Radetz	Stubenring, Vienna	1886-1892	Kaspar von Zumbusch, George Niemann (architect)	48.209956°N 16.382688°E	Originally on Am Hof square, moved to its present location in 1912. The pedestal is clad with red marble and decorated with bronze reliefs and plaques.
	Hussar	On the rooftop of Kohlmarkt 1, Vienna	1896	Rudolf Weyr	48.209295°N 16.368469°E	Copper statue referring to the traditional name of the building, "Zum Husaren".
	Archduke Albrecht, Duke of Teschen	In front of the Albertina, Vienna	1898-1899	Kaspar von Zumbusch, Carl König (architect)	48.20432°N 16.368476°E	On a Czech granite pedestal, decorated with bronze plaques and bands.

=== Burgenland ===
Image	Portrayed person	Location	Date	Sculptor	Coordinates	Note
	Paul I, Prince Esterházy	Courtyard of Forchtenstein Castle, Forchtenstein	1691	Michael Felser	47.7094°N 16.3308°E	Baroque stone sculpture with the coat-of-arms of Prince Esterházy and Turkish prisoners of war carved on the pedestal.

=== Lower Austria ===
Image	Portrayed person	Location	Date	Sculptor	Coordinates	Note
	Goddess Diana	Theaterpark, Berndorf	1908 (1997)	Kaspar von Zumbusch	47.945056°N 16.109561°E	Originally near the Am Brand villa of the Krupp family (until 1945), later loaned to the Jagdmuseum in Marchegg, finally erected in Theaterpark in 1997.
	Young naked rider	Kurpark, Baden bei Wien	1911 (1964)	Josef Müllner	48.010208°N 16.23345°E	The plaster model was exhibited in the Secession in 1908, the bronze statue was cast in 1911 and erected in Baden in 1964.
	A Kuenringer knight with a minstrel	Watstein, Dürnstein	1958	Alois Lidauer	48.40912°N 15.50609°E	Modern stone statue symbolizing the chivalric and Minnesang tradition of Wachau (often mistakenly identified as Richard the Lionheart and Blondel).
	Young naked rider	Wienerneustädter-Straße, Bad Vöslau	1964	Mathias Hietz	47.963556°N 16.216207°E	Modern concrete statue marking the site of a former horse trough.
	Emperor Marcus Aurelius	Marc-Aurel-Park, Tulln an der Donau	2001	Michail Nogin	48.33413°N 16.05652°E	Copy of the famous Roman statue, placed on a modern pedestal clad with granite slabs.
	Saint George killing the dragon	Feuerwehrplatz, Sankt Georgen am Ybbsfelde	2014	Odin Mohammed Rosenzweig	48.128893°N 14.949838°E	Metal sculpture marking the entrance of the village in the middle of a traffic roundabout.

=== Tyrol ===
Image	Portrayed person	Location	Date	Sculptor	Coordinates	Note
	Leopold V, Archduke of Austria	Rennweg, Innsbruck	1621-1630 (1894)	Caspar Gras	47.269062°N 11.395455°E	The first instance that the horse was successfully positioned on the two hind legs without using the tail as a third support. Erected in front of the Hoftheater as an equestrian statue on a stone pedestal in 1826; the present fountain monument was created in 1894 (see Leopoldsbrunnen).
	Saint George killing the dragon	Andreas Hofer-Platz, Wörgl	1928 (1971)	Franz Josef Kranewitter	47.485621°N 12.06537°E	War memorial that was originally part of a fountain ensemble; the fountain was removed in 1958, the bronze statue was moved to its present location in 1971.
	Meinhard II, Count of Tyrol	On the gable of Stams Abbey, Stams	1936 (1995)	Karl Larcher	47.277655°N 10.984221°E	Wooden statue of the founder of the abbey, replaced by an aluminium copy in 1995.

== Azerbaijan ==
Image	Portrayed person	Location	Date	Sculptor	Coordinates	Note
	Koroghlu	Koroğlu Parkı, Baku	2009-2012	Tokay Mammadov	40.39179°N 49.84251°E	Modern bronze statue of the folk hero on a tall pedestal clad with marble slabs.

== Belgium ==
Image	Portrayed person	Location	Date	Sculptor	Coordinates	Note
	Godfrey of Bouillon	Place Royale, Brussels	1843-1848	Eugène Simonis, Tilman-François Suys (pedestal)	50.8423°N 4.35948°E	The blue Arquennes stone pedestal is decorated with two bronze bas-reliefs by Guillaume de Groot (added in 1897) and plaques. The ornate railings were removed in the first half of the 20th century.
	Charlemagne	Boulevard d'Avroy, Liège	1863-1868	Louis Jehotte	50.635363°N 5.568449°E	The Romanesque stone pedestal is decorated with the bronze statues of six ancestors of Charlemagne who were connected to Liège; the niches are flanked with pink granite columns.
	Baldwin I of Constantinople	Place de Flandre, Mons	1864-1868	Joseph Jaquet	50.453780°N 3.960457°E	Modern stone pedestal decorated with two bronze reliefs; the original pedestal was designed by Charles Vincent in classical style. Moved from the middle of the square to its present location after the redevelopment of the roads.
	Leopold I of Belgium	Leopoldplaats, Antwerp	1868 (1872)	Joseph Geefs	51.212516°N 4.407316°E	Erected by the Chamber of Commerce outside the city area, moved to its present location in 1872; placed on a Neo-Baroque stone pedestal.
	The Horse at the Pond (unnamed rider)	Square Ambiorix, Brussels	1899-1901	Constantin Meunier	50.846947°N 4.382812°E	Placed on a bluestone pedestal beside a semi-circular pond.
	The Horse Bayard and The Four Sons of Aymon	Paul de Smet de Naeyerplein, Ghent	1913	Alois De Beule, Domien Ingels	51.031696°N 3.717709°E	Created for the Ghent International Exposition, and remained in place; set in a circular pond.
	Leopold II of Belgium	Place du Trône, Brussels	1914-1926	Thomas Vinçotte, François Malfait (architect)	50.8405°N 4.36439°E	Placed on a bluestone Art Deco pedestal in front of the Royal Palace; controversial.
	Leopold II of Belgium	Koning Boudewijnpromenade, Ostend	1929-1931	Alfred Courtens, Antoine Courtens (architect)	51.22715°N 2.90466°E	Monumental Art Deco ensemble on the beach facing the North Sea with the statue of the king on top of a pillar, two large sculptural groups (The Gratitude of the Congolese and Tribute of the fishermen of Ostend), and a young woman carrying a torch; controversial and vandalized.
	Albert I of Belgium	De Ganzenpoot, Nieuwpoort	1937-1938	Karel Aubroeck, Henri-Julien De Ridder (architect)	51.136114°N 2.756206°E	Placed on a yellow brick pedestal as part of the monumental West Front Memorial complex commemorating the Battle of the Yser.
	Albert I of Belgium	Place de l'Albertine, Brussels	1946-1951	Alfred Courtens, Jules Ghobert (architect)	50.844167°N 4.35625°E	Placed on a bluestone pedestal as part of the monumental Mont des Arts complex.
	Albert I of Belgium	Avenue Albert Ier, Namur	1952-1955	Victor Demanet	50.466657°N 4.885194°E	The stone plinth is decorated with the king's initial; originally erected at the confluence of the Sambre and the Meuse, moved to its present location after a restoration in 2015.

== Bolivia ==
Image	Portrayed person	Location	Date	Sculptor	Coordinates	Note
	Simón Bolívar	Plaza Bolívar, Caracas	1874	Adamo Tadolino		This statue in Caracas is a copy of the same statue of Bolívar in Lima. A second copy can be found in San Francisco.

== Bosnia and Herzegovina ==
Image	Portrayed person	Location	Date	Sculptor	Coordinates	Note
	King Petar I Karađorđević	Bijeljina	1926	Rudolf Valdec		The statue was demolished in 1941 by Ustashas and was restored in 1992.

== Brazil ==
=== Pernambuco ===
Image	Portrayed person	Location	Date	Sculptor	Coordinates	Note
	Plínio Pacheco	Brejo da Madre de Deus	-	-	-	Depicts journalist and theatre director Plínio Pacheco in the New Jerusalem theater

=== Rio Grande do Sul ===
Image	Portrayed person	Location	Date	Sculptor	Coordinates	Note
	Manuel Luís Osório	Porto Alegre	-	Hildegardo Leão Velloso	-	Depicts the Marquis of Herval, cavalry officer and hero of the Paraguayan War
	Bento Gonçalves	Porto Alegre	1936	Antônio Caringi	-	Depicts Bento Gonçalves, the first president of the Piratini Republic

=== Rio de Janeiro ===
Image	Portrayed person	Location	Date	Sculptor	Coordinates	Note
	Pedro I of Brazil	Rio de Janeiro	1862	Louis Rochet	22°54′25″S 43°10′58″W	Depicts Pedro I, the first emperor of Brazil, holding Brazil's first constitution. See equestrian statue of Pedro I.
	John VI	Rio de Janeiro	-	Salvador Barata Feyo	-	Depicts John VI, King of the United Kingdom of Portugal, Brazil and the Algarves
	Manuel Luís Osório	Rio de Janeiro	-	Rodolfo Bernardelli	-	Depicts the Marquis of Herval, cavalry officer and hero of the Paraguayan War
	Deodoro da Fonseca	Rio de Janeiro	-	Modestino Kanto	-	Depicts Deodoro da Fonseca, Brazil's first president

=== São Paulo ===
Image	Portrayed person	Location	Date	Sculptor	Coordinates	Note
	Luís Alves de Lima e Silva	São Paulo	-	Victor Brecheret	-	Depicts the Duke of Caxias, prime minister of Brazil and hero of the Paraguayan War
	Bandeiras	São Paulo	1954	Victor Brecheret	-	Depicts a bandeira, expeditions to explore Brazil's interior during the colonial era. See monument to the bandeiras.
	Ramos de Azevedo	São Paulo	1934	Galileo Emendabili	-	Depicts architect Ramos de Azevedo. See monument to Ramos de Azevedo.
	Tropeiro	Sorocaba	1972	-	-	Depicts a tropeiro.

== Bulgaria ==
Image	Portrayed person	Location	Date	Sculptor	Coordinates	Note
	Tsar Alexander II of Russia	National Assembly Square, Sofia	1901-1903	Arnoldo Zocchi	42.6937°N 23.33249°E	Depicts Alexander II of Russia who liberated the serfs.
	Georgi Benkovski	Koprivshtitsa	1976	Hristo Tanev	-	Benkovski was a Bulgarian revolutionary leader who led the Bulgarians in the April Uprising of 1876.
	Khan Asparuh of Bulgaria	Dobrich	1981	Velichko Minekov	-	The erecting of the statue in 1981 marked the 1300th birthday of Bulgaria
	Khans Ivan Asen I, Peter II, Kaloyan and Ivan Asen II of the Asen dynasty	Veliko Tarnovo	Krum Damianov	1985	-	The erecting of the statues marked the 800th birthday of the Bulgarian rebellion against the Byzantines.
	Don Quixote and Sancho Panza	House of Humor and Satire, Gabrovo	1993	Georgi Chapkanov	-	-
	Khan Krum	Plovdiv	2007	Nikolay Savov	-	Krum was a medieval khan of the Bulgarians who led his people to the region of present-day Bulgaria.
	Khan Krum	Targovishte	-	Vasil Radoslavov	-	Krum was a medieval khan of the Bulgarians who led his people to the region of present-day Bulgaria.
	Khan Kaloyan of Bulgaria	Varna	2008	Boris & Konstantinov Borisov	-	Varna was the Bulgarian khan who liberated Varna from the Byzantines.

== Canada ==
Image	Portrayed person	Location	Date	Sculptor	Coordinates	Note
	Bernardo O'Higgins	Quebec City, Quebec	2007			Located on the grounds of the parc de l'Amerique-Latine, the statue was gifted to the government of Quebec from the government of Chile. It was installed in 2007 although was not formally unveiled until 2008, in the presence of the president of Chile and the premier of Quebec.
	Clem Gardner and unnamed rider	Calgary, Alberta	2012	Bob Spaith and Rich Roenisch		Located on the grounds of the Calgary Stampede. The sculpture is titled By the Banks of the Bow and includes 15 horses and two riders; with the lead rider being Clem Gardner, the first Canadian All Around champion at the inaugural Calgary Stampede
	King Edward VII	Toronto, Ontario	1969	Thomas Brock		Located on the grounds of Queen's Park. The sculpture was created in 1911 for the Delhi Durbar and was located in Delhi, India until 1967 when it was removed. The statue was transported to Canada in 1968 and installed at its present location in the following year.
	Queen Elizabeth II	Ottawa, Ontario	1992	Jack Harman		Located on the grounds of Parliament Hill. The monument was erected to commemorate both Canada the 125th anniversary of Canadian Confederation, as well as the Ruby Jubilee of Elizabeth II. The statue has been temporarily relocated to the gates of Rideau Hall in 2019, in order to facilitate the decade-long renovations taking place on the Centre Block.
	Queen Elizabeth II	Regina, Saskatchewan	2005	Susan Velder		Located within the Queen Elizabeth II Gardens at the Wascana Centre, the statue was unveiled by the Queen during her golden jubilee year. The horse that is portrayed in the statue is Burmese, a horse gifted to Elizabeth II by the Royal Canadian Mounted Police.
	Gabriel Dumont	Saskatoon, Saskatchewan	1985	William Epp		Located on the grounds of Friendship Park.
	Saint George	Saint-Georges, Quebec	1915	Louis Jobin		Located on the grounds of the Church of Saint-Georges, the statue depicts the legend of Saint George and the Dragon.
	George Lane	Bar U Ranch, Alberta		Rich Roenisch		Located on the grounds of the Bar U Ranch, National Historic Site of Canada. Titled A Question of Survival, the sculpture depicts former ranch owner George Lane fend off an attack from wolves
	Ian Millar	Perth, Ontario	2005			Located on the grounds of Stewart Park, the sculpture depicts Ian Millar riding his world champion show jumping horse Big Ben.
	James Macleod	Calgary, Alberta				Located on the grounds of Fort Calgary.
	James Macleod	Ottawa, Ontario	2005			Located on the grounds of Royal Canadian Mounted Police Headquarters. The statue is a replica of the James Macleod statue at Fort Calgary. However, in addition to commemorating Macleod, the statue is also used as a memorial for RCMP members who were killed while on policing duty.
	James Morrow Walsh and Sitting Bull	Cypress Hills, Saskatchewan				Located on the grounds of Fort Walsh, the sculpture depicts the meeting of James Morrow Walsh, the superintendent of the North-West Mounted Police and Sitting Bull, a Sioux chief; both figures are on horseback.
	Joan of Arc	Quebec City, Quebec		Anna Hyatt Huntington		Located on the grounds of the Joan of Arc Gardens. The statue was donated to the park by Anna Hyatt Huntington and commemorates those who fought for New France during the conquest of 1760.
	Robert the Bruce	Calgary, Alberta	1966	Pilkington Jackson		Located on the grounds of the Alberta University of the Arts. The statue is a replica of another statue built near Stirling, Scotland two years earlier. Calgary-based lawyer Eric Harvie assisted in having the statue in Stirling installed, and later pushed for a replica to be built in Calgary.
	Maharaja Ranjit Singh	Mississauga, Ontario				Located on the grounds of the Great Punjab Business Centre.
	Simón Bolívar	Quebec City, Quebec	1983	Adamo Tadolini		Located on the grounds of the parc de l'Amerique-Latine, the statue was gifted to the government of Quebec from the government of Venezuela and unveiled on the bicentenary of Bolívar's birthday.
	Tecumseh	Windsor, Ontario	2018	Mark Williams		Located at the centre of a roundabout near the Detroit River, in the neighbourhood of Old Sandwich Town. The monument also features a statue of Major General Isaac Brock standing next to Tecumseh using his spyglass.
	William D. Jarvis	Fort Saskatchewan, Alberta	2013			Jarvis was an inspectator with the North West Mounted Police. In 1875, Jarvis and other NWMP officers established Fort Saskatchewan on the North Saskatchewan River.
	—N/a	Calgary, Alberta	1980	Rich Roenisch		Located on the grounds of the Calgary Stampede. The sculpture is titled The Bronc Twister and is based on a drawing by Edward Borein. The sculpture does not portray a specific individual.
	—N/a	Calgary, Alberta	1914	Louis-Philippe Hébert		Located on the grounds of Central Memorial Park. The sculpture is modelled after Russell Lambert Boyle, a veteran of the war; although the sculpture does not explicitly portray him, with the sculpture used as war memorial for the Second Boer War.
	—N/a	Meadow Lake, Saskatchewan	1970	William Epp		Located on Centre Street in downtown Meadow Lake. The statue was installed there by the Meadow Lake Racing and Sports Association. The sculpture depicts a cowboy and a bucking horse and commemorates the early settlers of the community. The sculpture does not portray a specific individual.
	—N/a	Montreal, Quebec				Located within downtown Montreal on Saint Jacques Street. The sculpture does not portray a specific individual.
	—N/a	Toronto, Ontario	1989	William McElcheran		Located on the grounds of St. Michael's College School, and forms a part of the University of Toronto's art collection. The sculpture is titled Business Man on Horse. The statue do not portray a specific individual.
	—N/a	Windsor, Ontario		William McElcheran		Previously located on the grounds of Windsor Sculpture Park, although acts of vandalism against the sculpture led to its removal. The sculpture is titled Business Man on Horse. The sculpture does not portray a specific individual.
	—N/a	Yorkton, Saskatchewan	2010	Lionel Peyachew		Located on the grounds of Painted Hand Casino. The sculpture is titled Counting Coup, named after a practice with warriors of the First Nations of the Canadian Prairies. The sculpture does not portray a specific individual.

== Chile ==
Santiago de Chile

- Equestrian of José de San Martín.
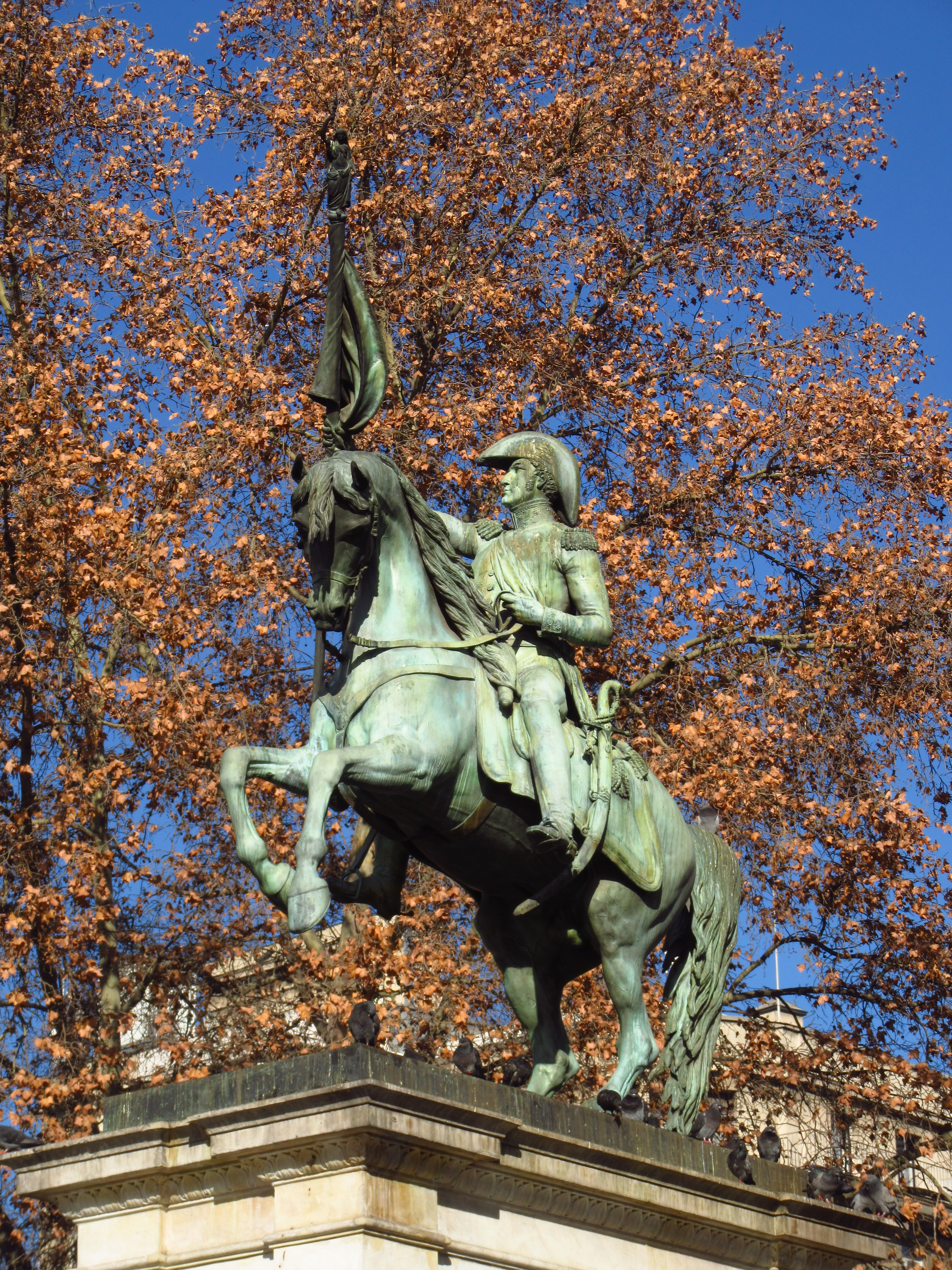
Statue of José de San Martín in Santiago de Chile

== China ==
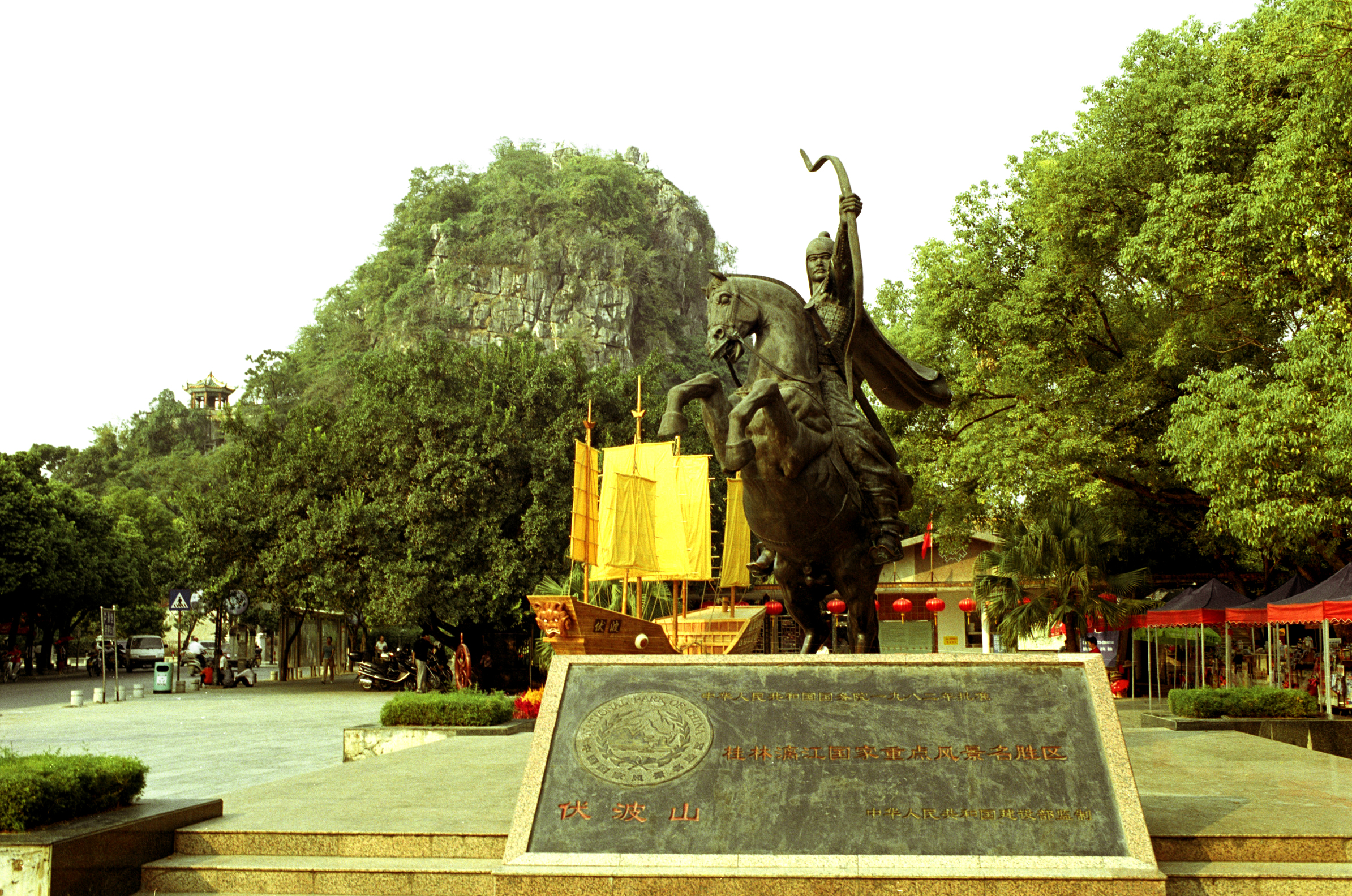
Statue of Ma Yuan at Fuboshan, Guilin.

Dalian, Liaoning Province

- Equestrian statue of Guan Xiangying. (Jinzhou District)

Hohhot, Inner Mongolia

- Genghis Khan monument
- Wang Zhaojun and the Xiongnu shanyu Huhanye on horseback (at Zhaojun's Tomb)

Ordos, Inner Mongolia

- Genghis Khan statue before his Mausoleum

Fuboshan, Guilin

- Statue of Ma Yuan
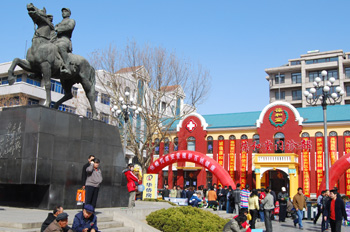
Guan Xiangying statue at Xiangying Square, Jinzhou District, Dalian

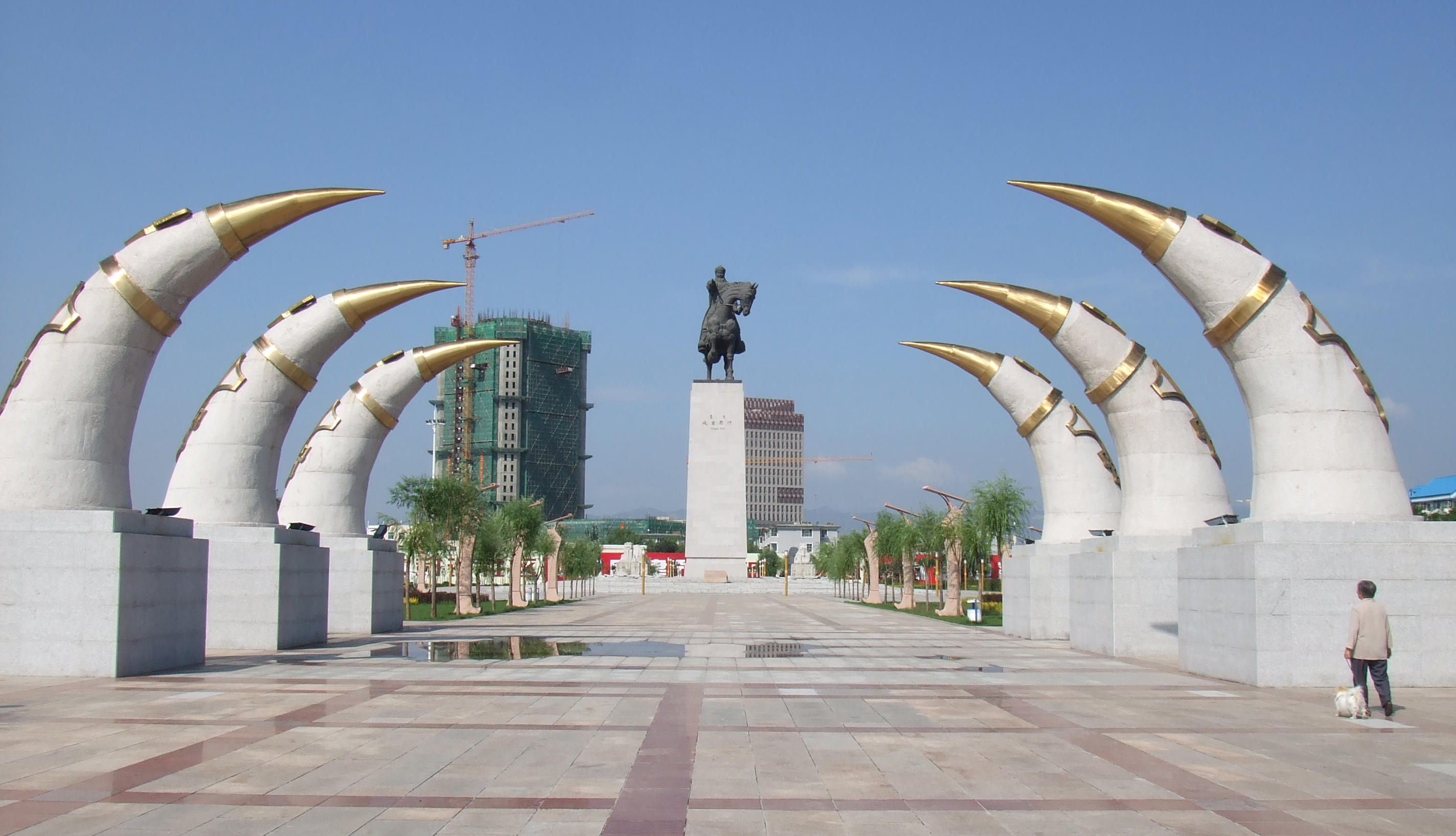
Genghis Khan monument in Hohhot

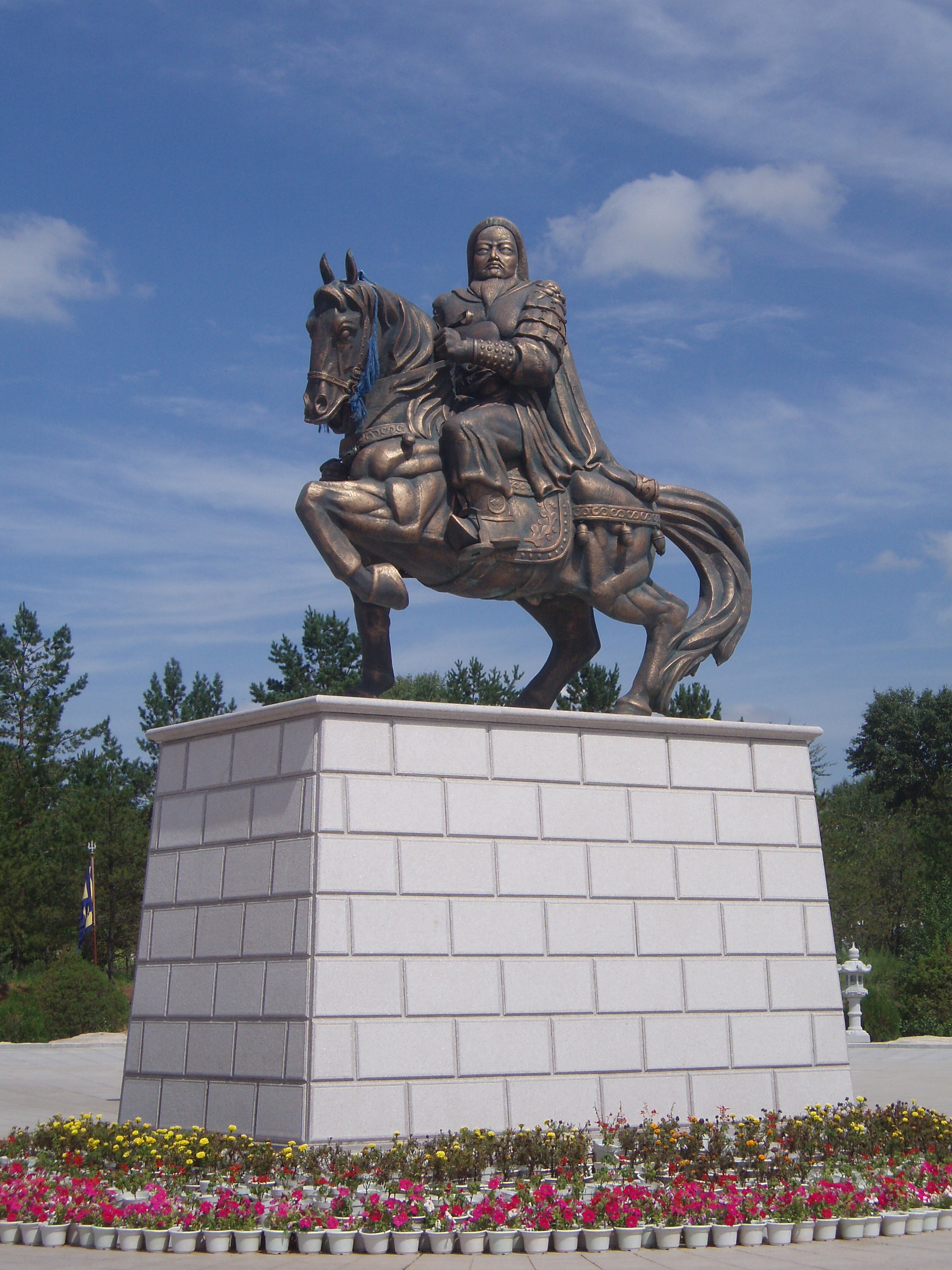
The statue of Genghis Khan in Ordos

== China - Taiwan ==
Taipei, Taiwan

- Equestrian statue of Yue Fei in Linsen Park

== Colombia ==
Barranquilla

- Equestrian of Simón Bolívar.

Cartagena

- Equestrian of Simón Bolívar.

Medellín

- Equestrian of Simón Bolívar by Eugenio Maccagnani at the Parque de Bolívar.
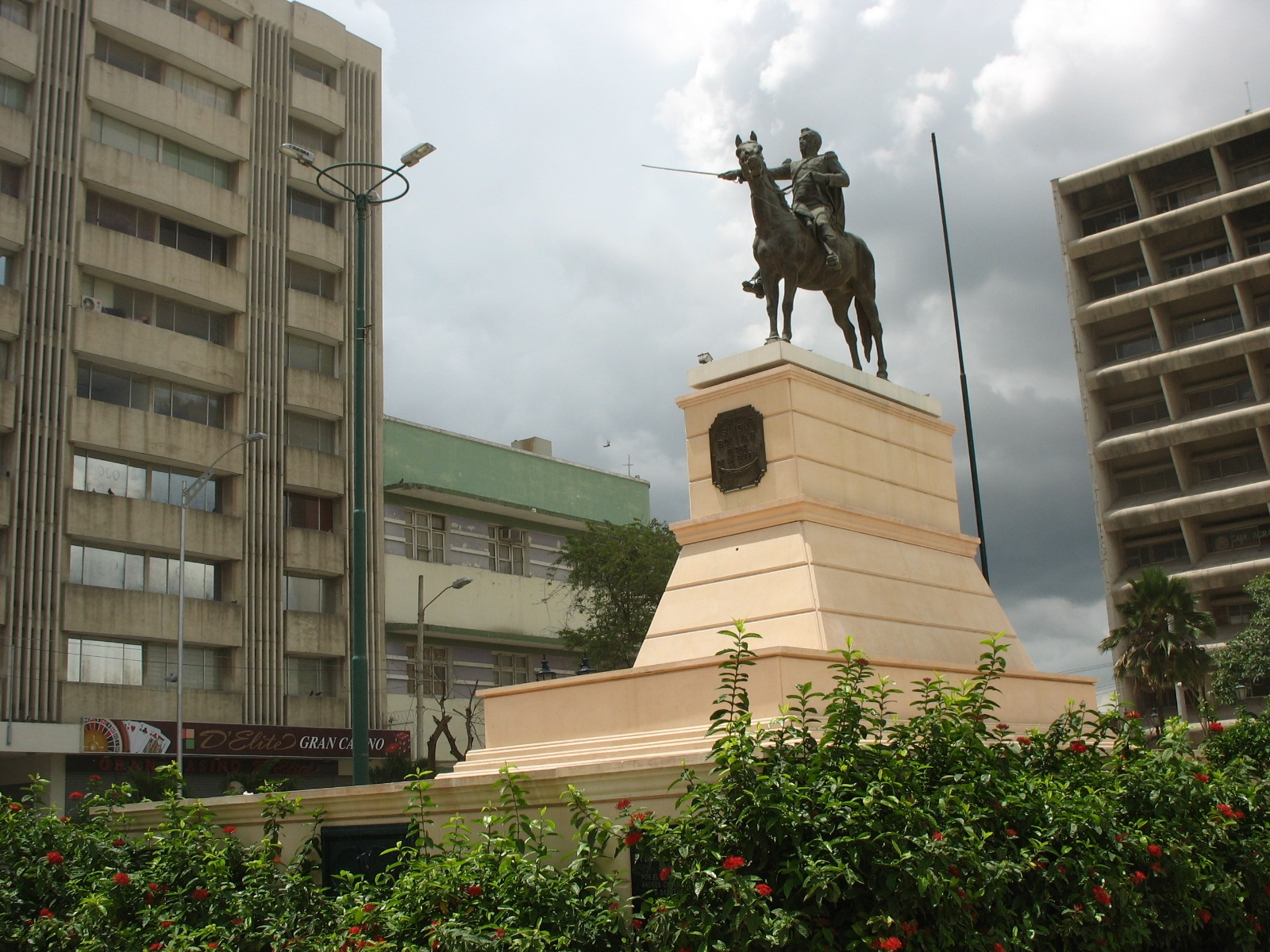
Simón Bolívar in Barranquilla

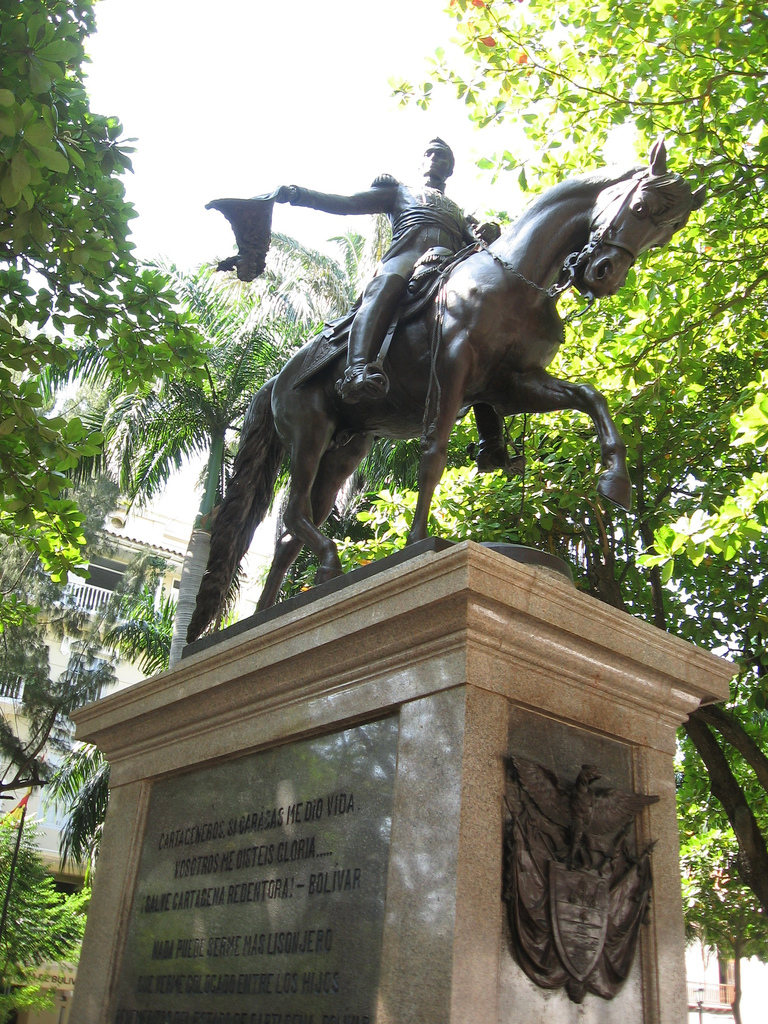
Simón Bolívar in Cartagena

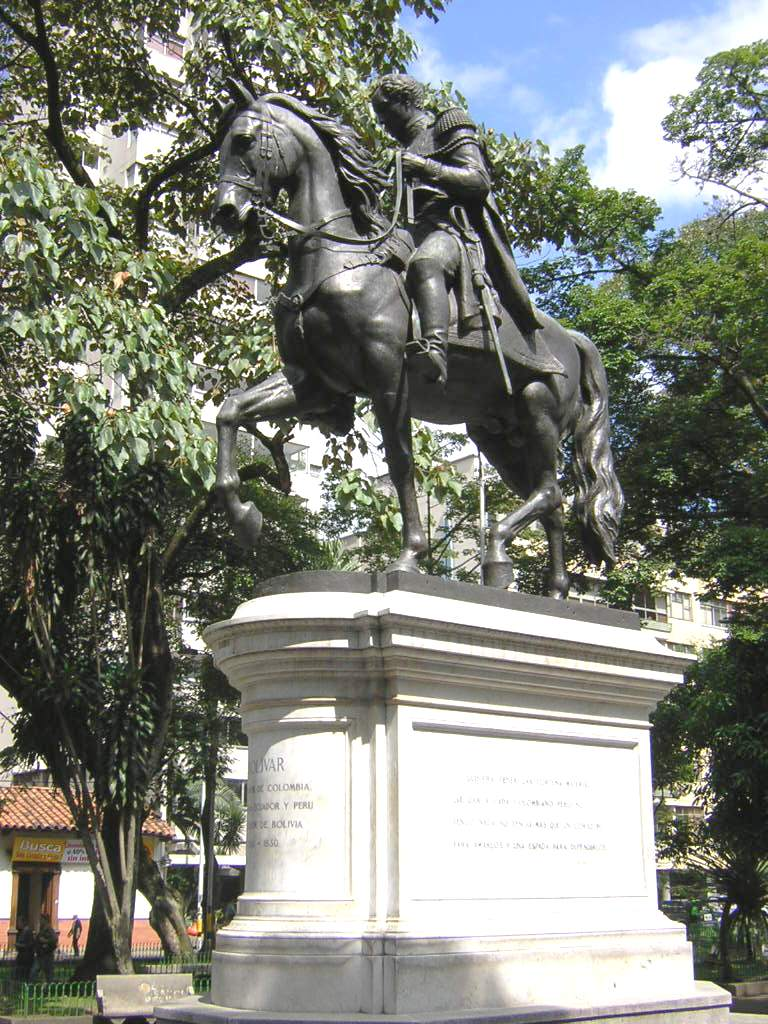
Simón Bolívar in Medellín

== Croatia ==
Zagreb

- Equestrian of Ban Josip Jelačić at the Ban Jelačić Square.
- Equestrian of King Tomislav by Robert Frangeš Mihanović, 1928–38, erected in 1947.
- Equestrian of Saint George at the Republic of Croatia Square.
- Equestrian of Saint George at the Trg Braće hrvatskog zmaja.
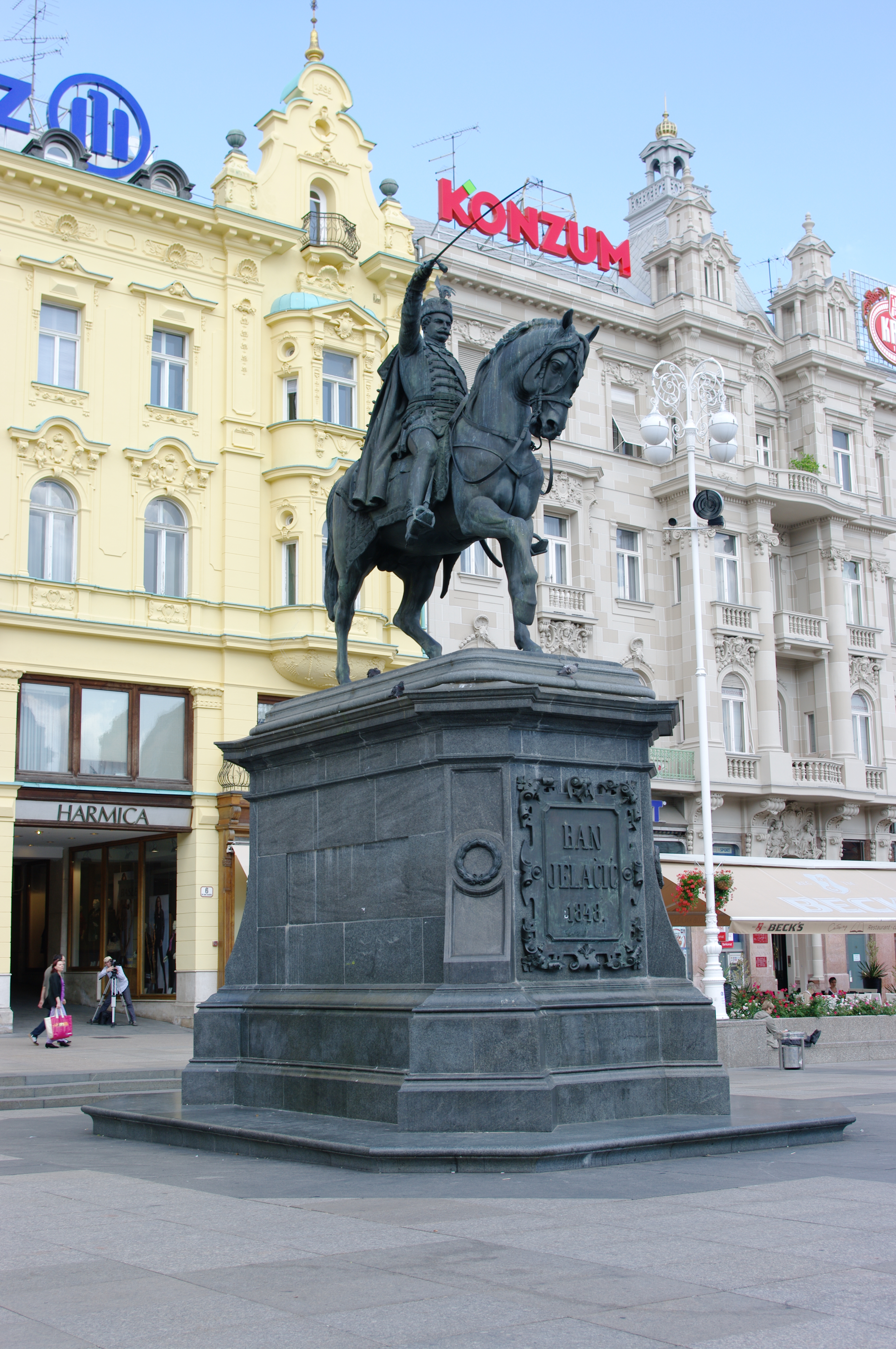
Ban Josip Jelačić in Zagreb

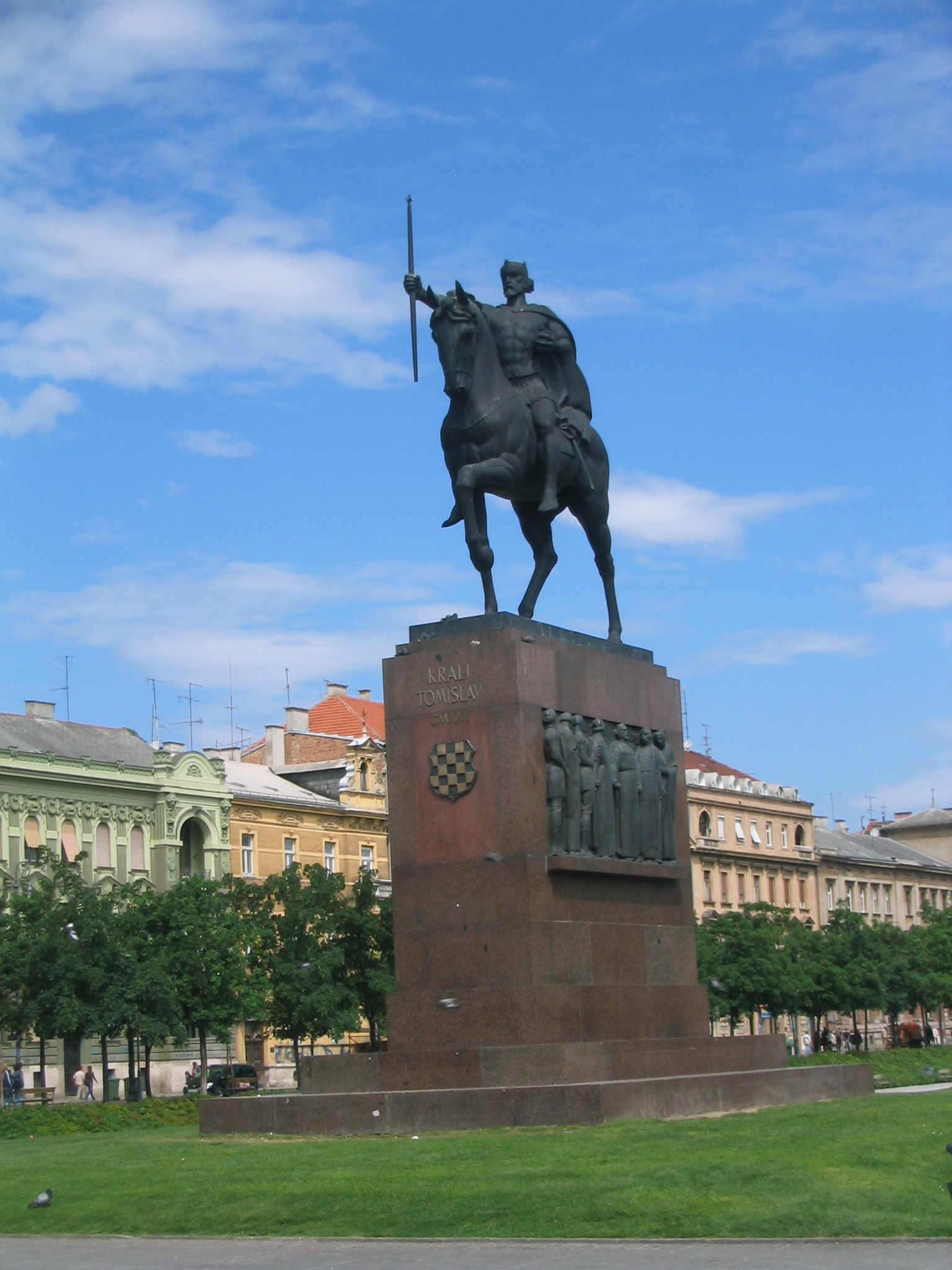
King Tomislav in Zagreb

== Cuba ==
Havana

- Equestrian of Major General Máximo Gómez by Aldo Gamba at the Malecón, 1936.
- Equestrian of Major General Antonio Maceo by Giuseppe Boni at the Malecón.
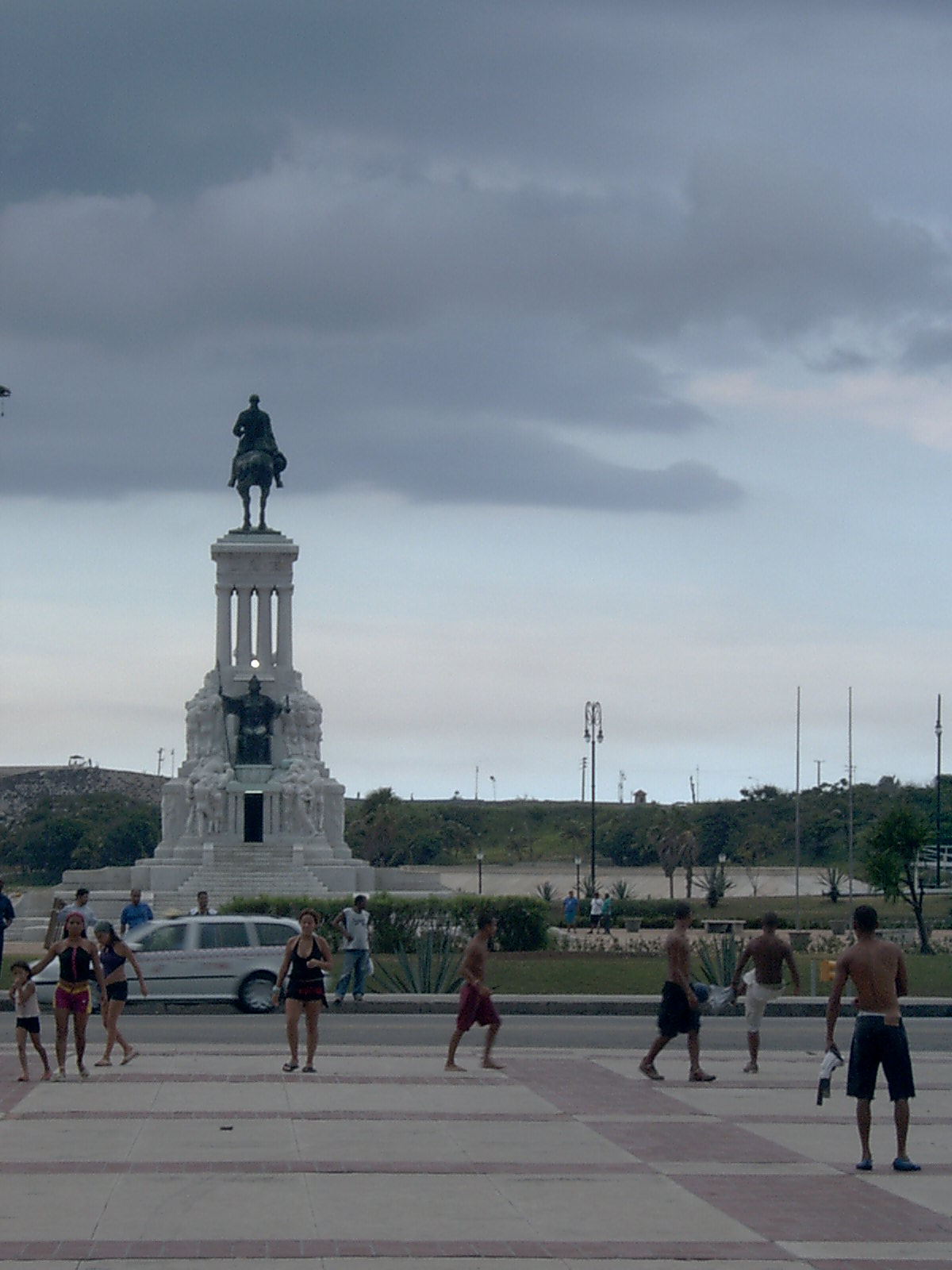
Máximo Gómez in Havana

== Czech Republic ==
Prague

- Equestrian monument of Wenceslaus, Duke of Bohemia by Josef Václav Myslbek at Wenceslas Square, 1912.
- Monument of Wenceslaus, Duke of Bohemia by Jan Jiří Bendl, between 1676 and 1678. Formerly at Wenceslas Square (before 1879), now in Vyšehrad.
- Equestrian monument of Jan Žižka by Bohumil Kafka in Žižkov - 9 m tall.
- Equestrian monument of Francis I by Josef Max on the Vltava bank, 1850.
- Equestrian statue of Jaroslav Hašek near the pubs where he wrote his works in Žižkov by Karel Nepraš and Karolína Neprašová, 2005
- Equestrian statue of Saint George in 3rd courtyard of Prague Castle.
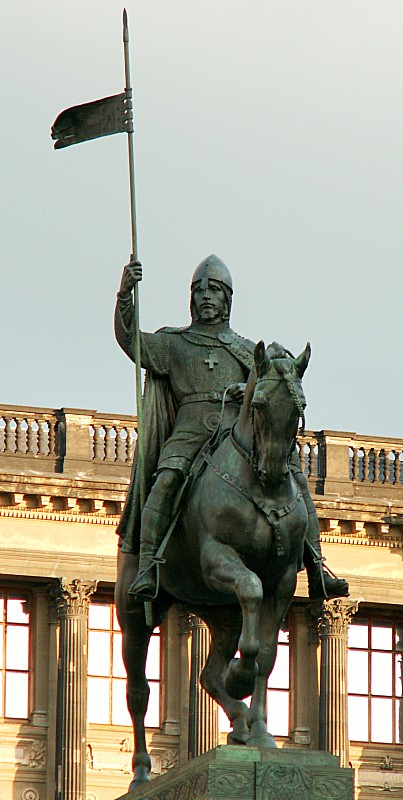
Saint Wenceslaus on Wenceslas Square

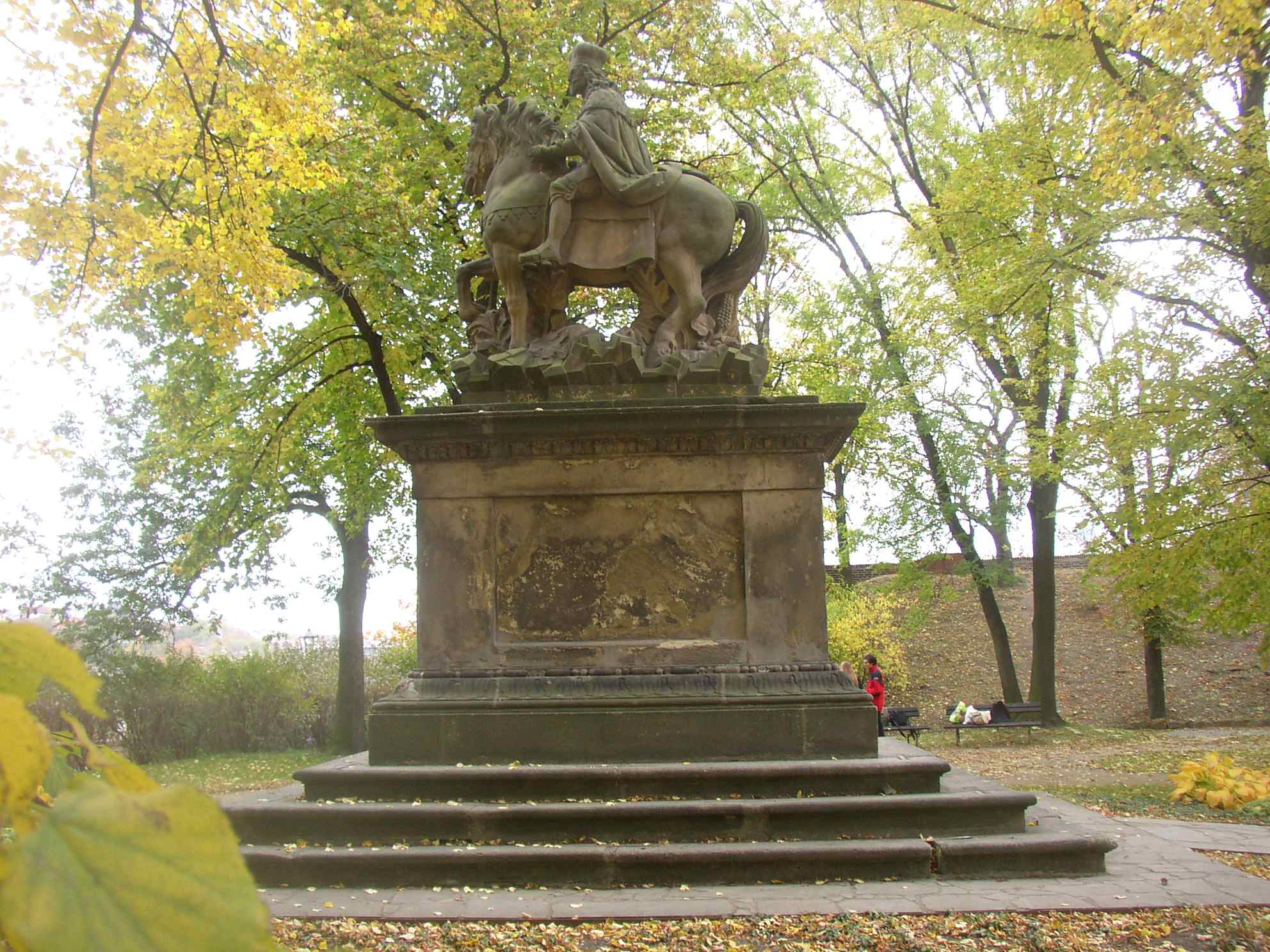
Monument of Saint Wenceslaus at Vyšehrad

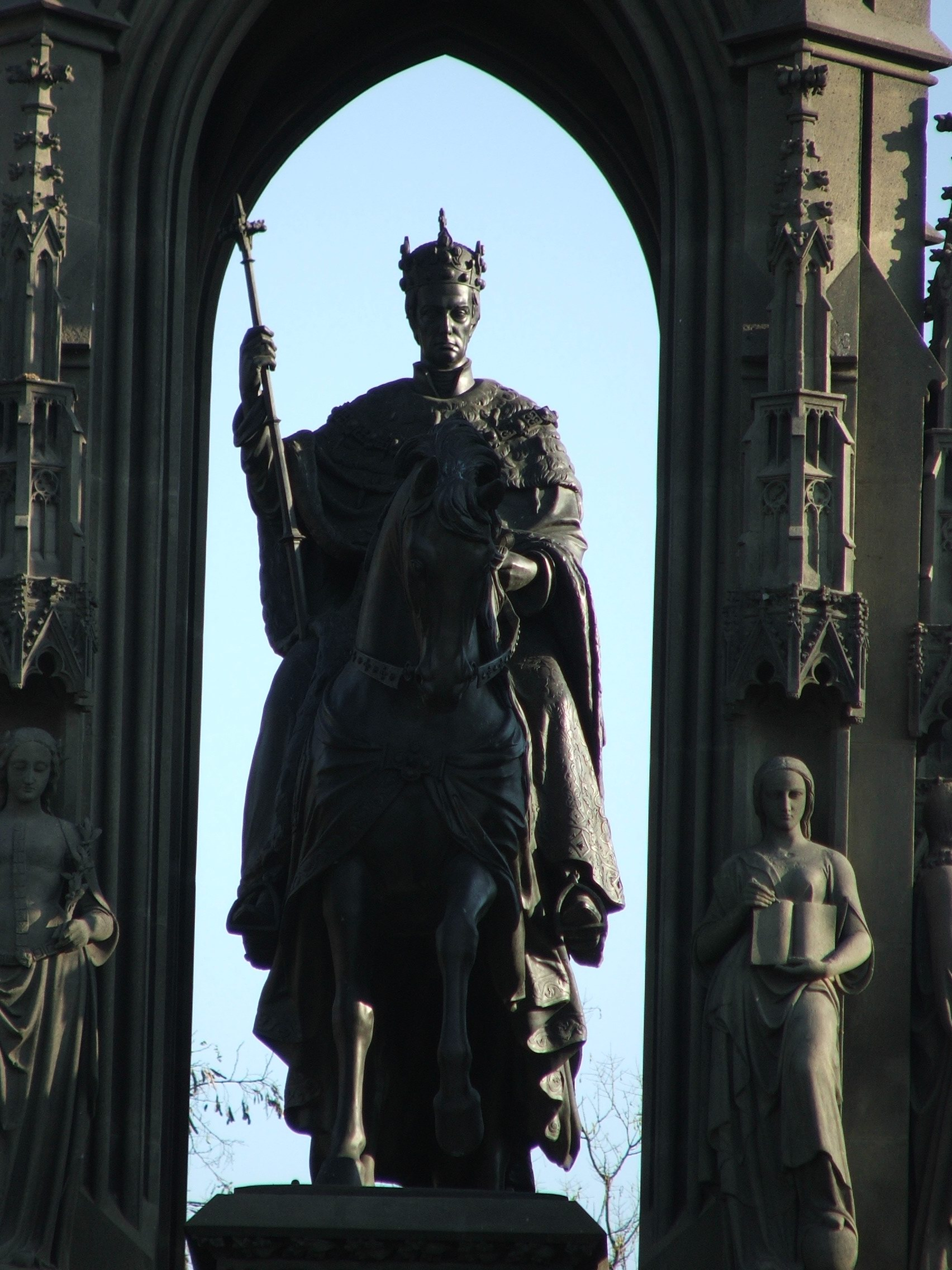
Monument of Francis I

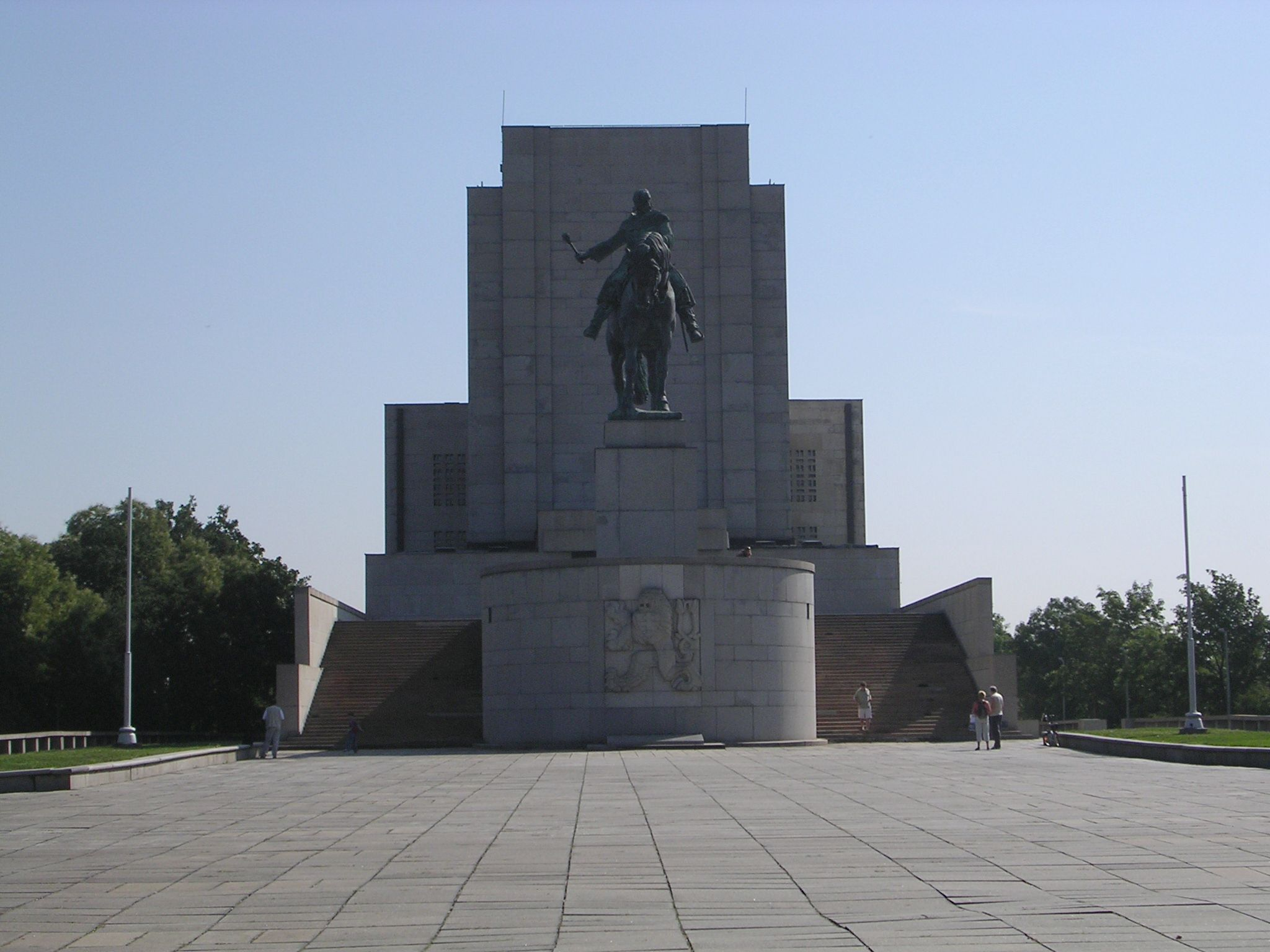
Jan Žižka at Vítkov Hill

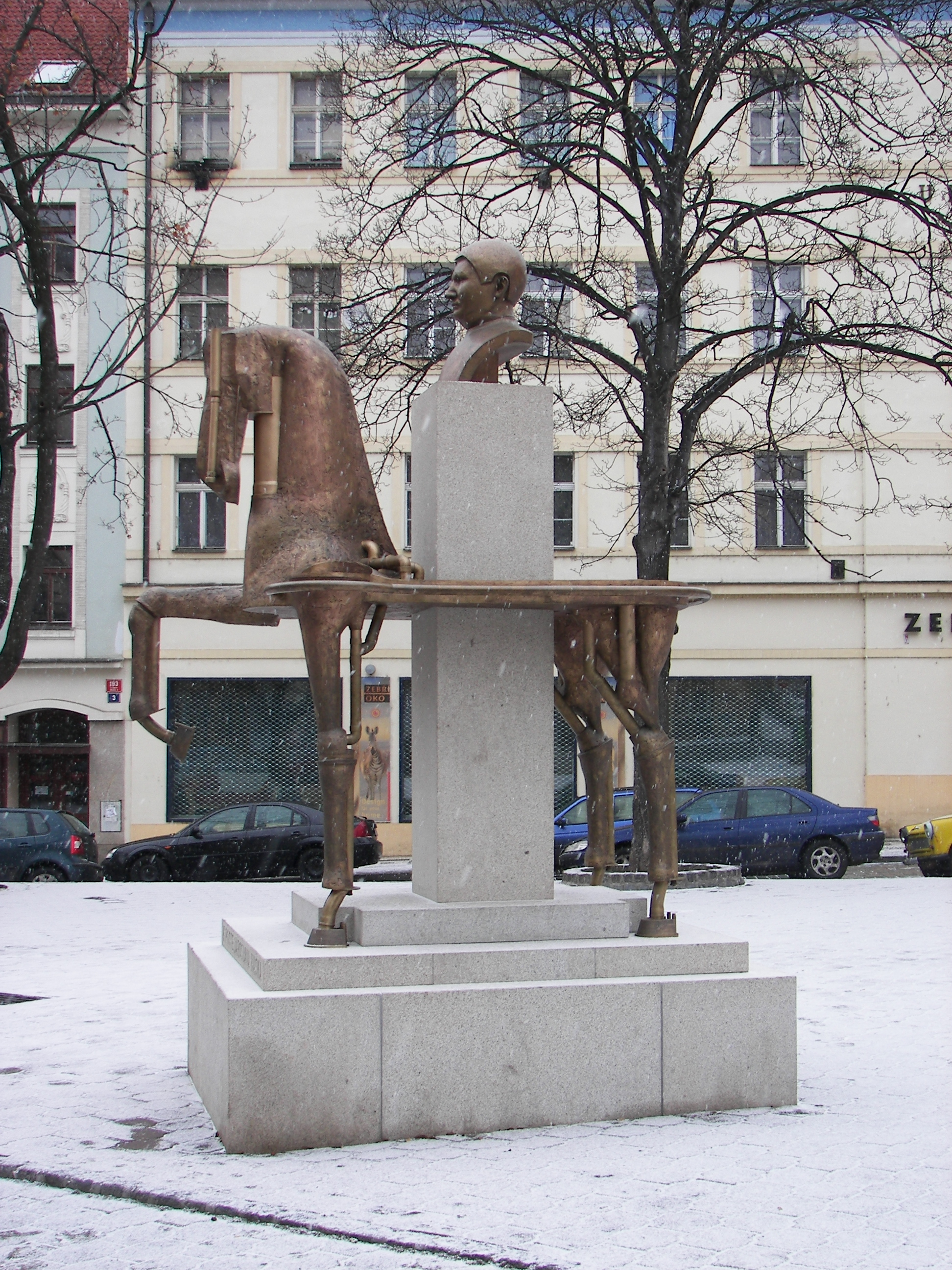
Statue of Jaroslav Hašek in Žižkov

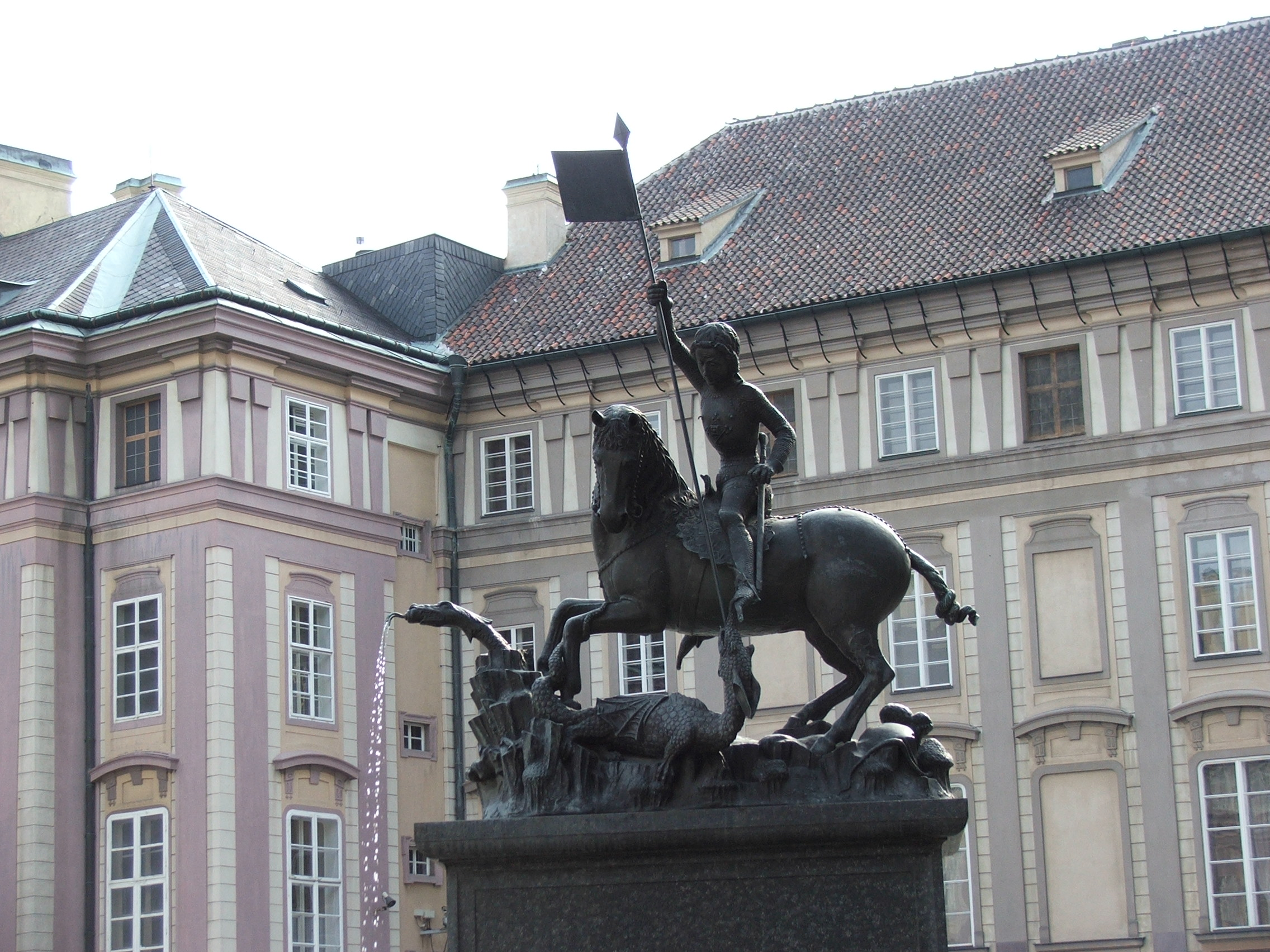
Statue of Saint George in Prague Castle

Poděbrady

- Equestrian monument of George of Podebrady by Bohuslav Schnirch at George Square, 1896.
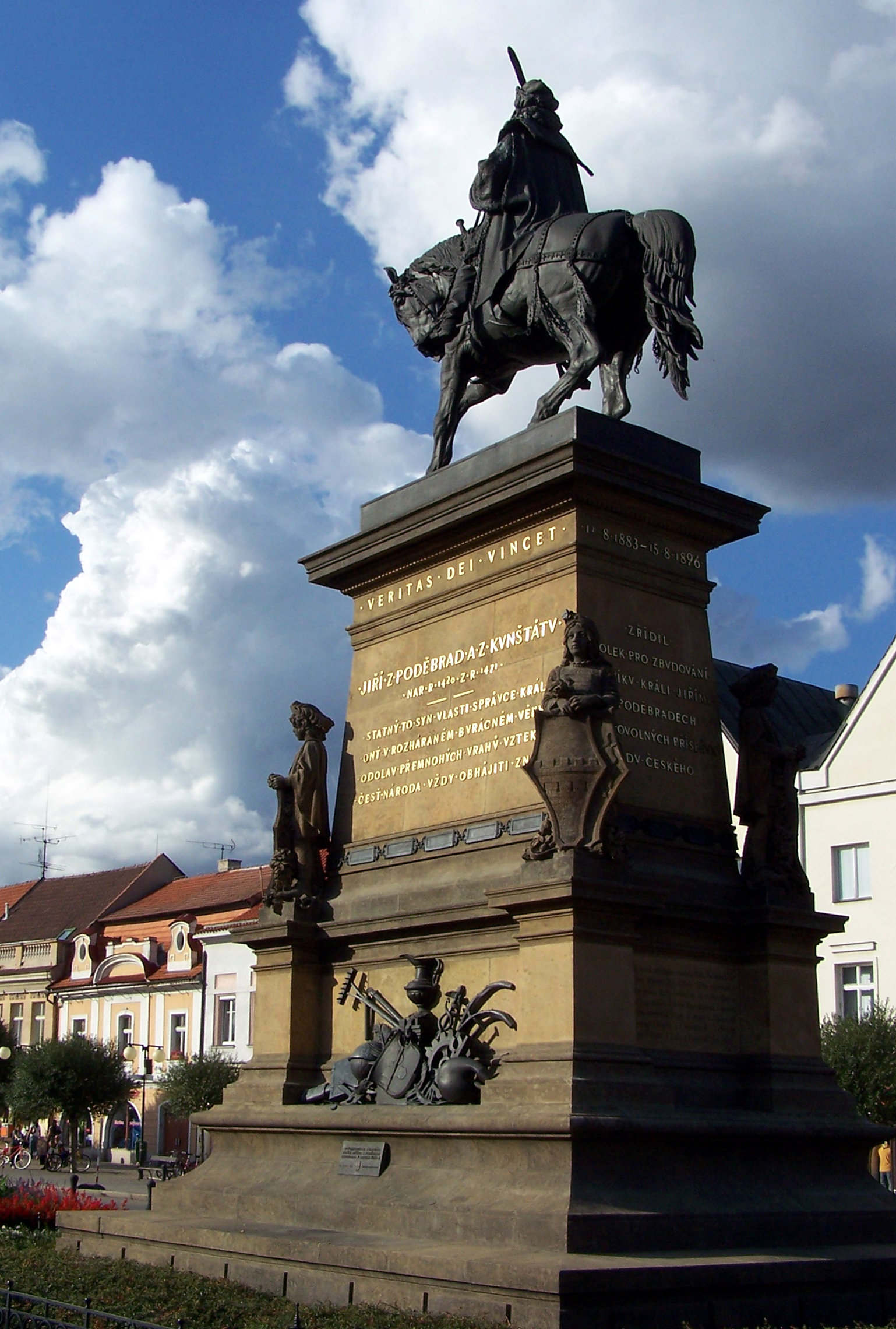
Monument of George of Podebrady in Poděbrady

== Denmark ==
Copenhagen

- Equestrian monument of Bishop Absalon in bronze by Vilhelm Bissen on Højbro Plads, erected 1902.
- Equestrian monument of King Christian V by French sculptor Abraham-César Lamoureux (c. 1640–1692) on Kongens Nytorv (The King's New Square). Originally in lead 1688, replaced in 1946 by a bronze copy.
- Equestrian monument of King Frederik V in bronze by Jacques-Francois-Joseph Saly in front of Amalienborg Palace, erected 1771.
- Equestrian monument of Frederik VII in bronze by Herman Wilhelm Bissen on Christiansborg Palace Square, erected 1873.
- Equestrian monument of King Christian IX in bronze by Anne Marie Carl-Nielsen in Christiansborg Palace, erected 1927.
- Equestrian monument of King Christian X in bronze by Einar Utzon-Frank on St. Annæ Square, erected in 1954.
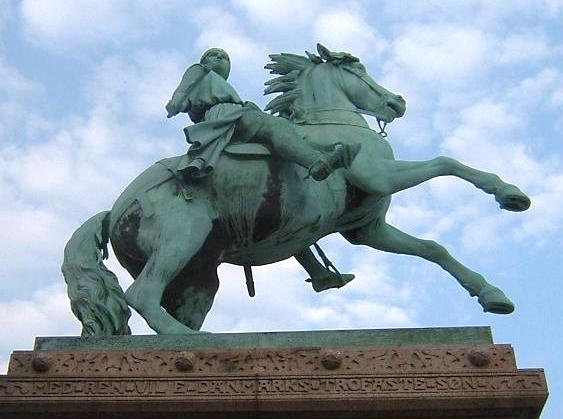
Bishop Absalon on Højbro Plads

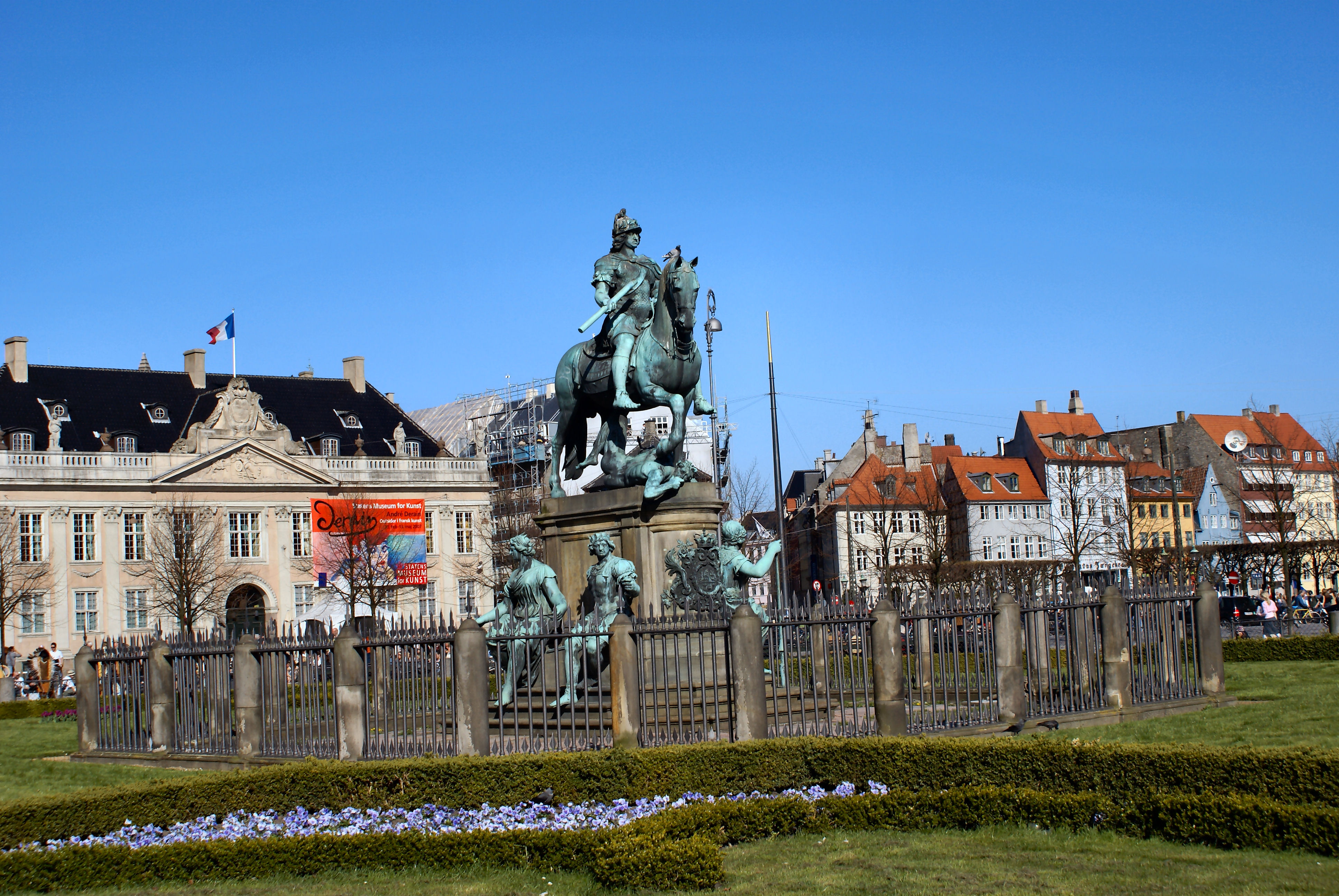
King Christian V on Kongens Nytorv

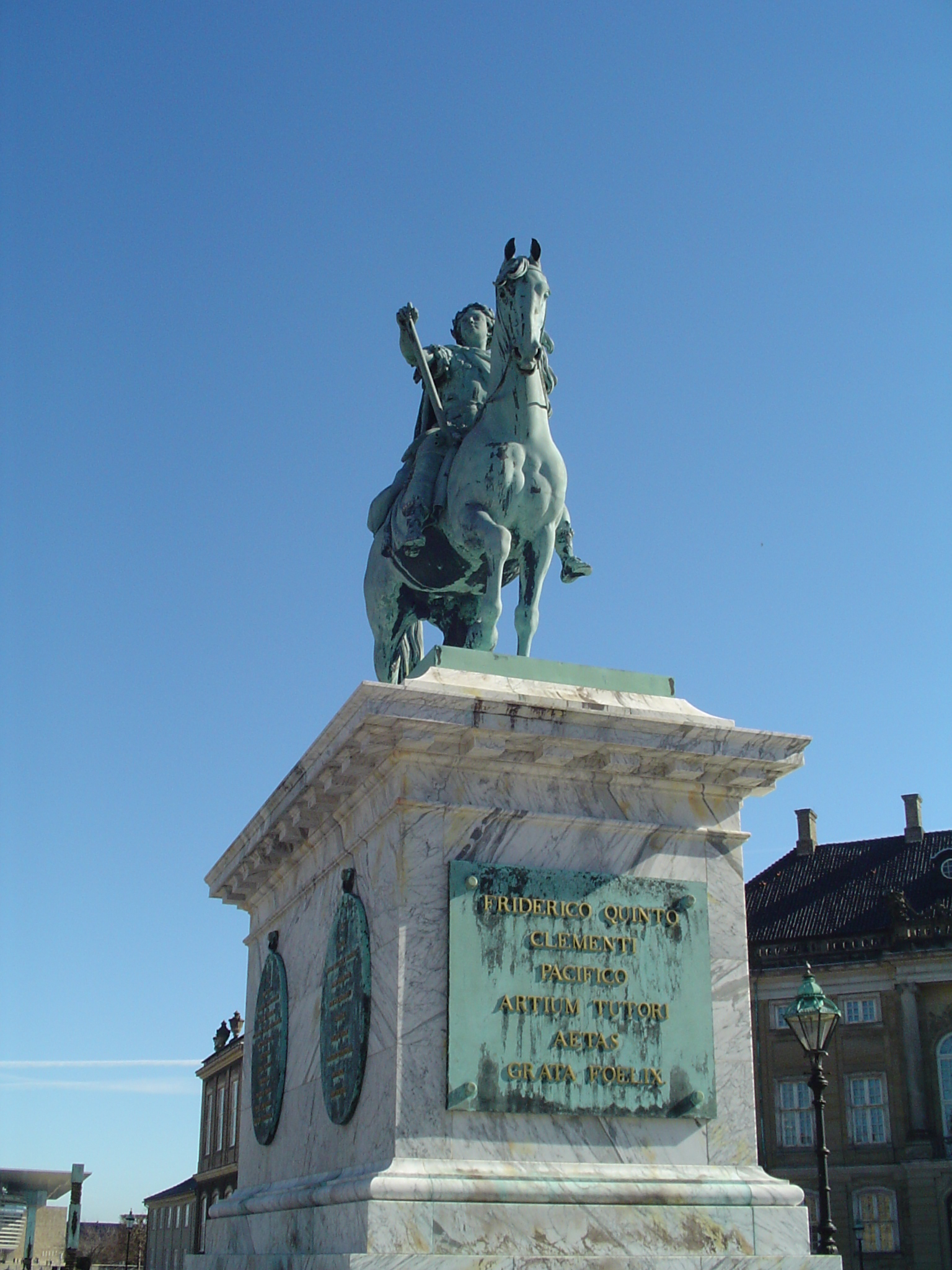
King Frederik V on Amalienborg Palace Square

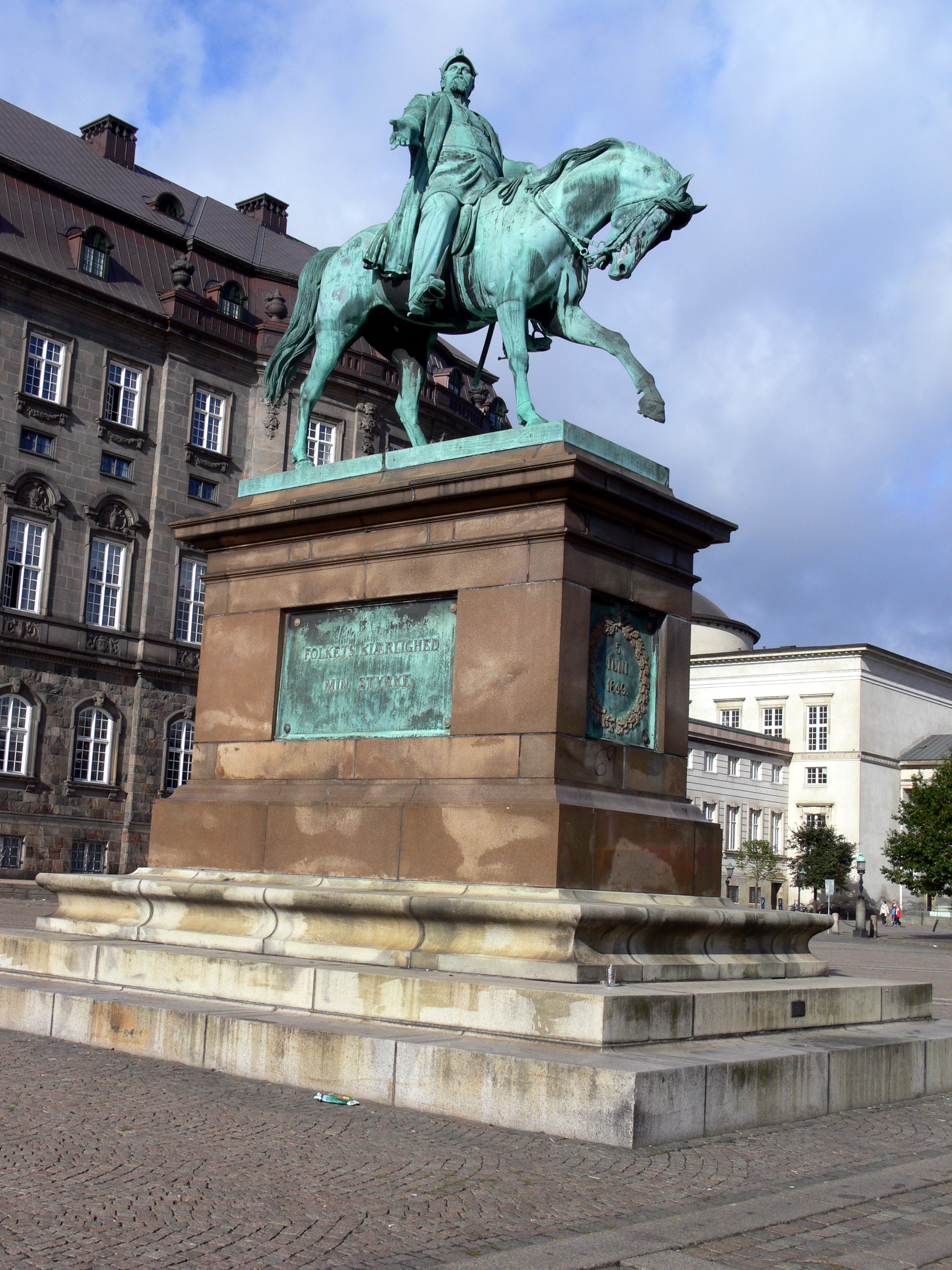
King Frederik VII on Christiansborg Palace Square

Aarhus

- Equestrian monument of King Christian X in bronze by Helen Schou on Bispetorv (Bishop's Square), erected in 1955.

Aalborg

- Equestrian monument of King Christian IX in bronze by Carl Johan Bonnesen, erected 1910.

Esbjerg

- Equestrian monument of King Christian IX of Denmark in bronze by L. Brandstrup, erected 1899.

Hvidovre

- Equestrian statue of Postrytter (Mail-horseman) placed just outside the old Hvidovre Post Office on Hvidovrevej, by Johannes Bjerg, 1935.
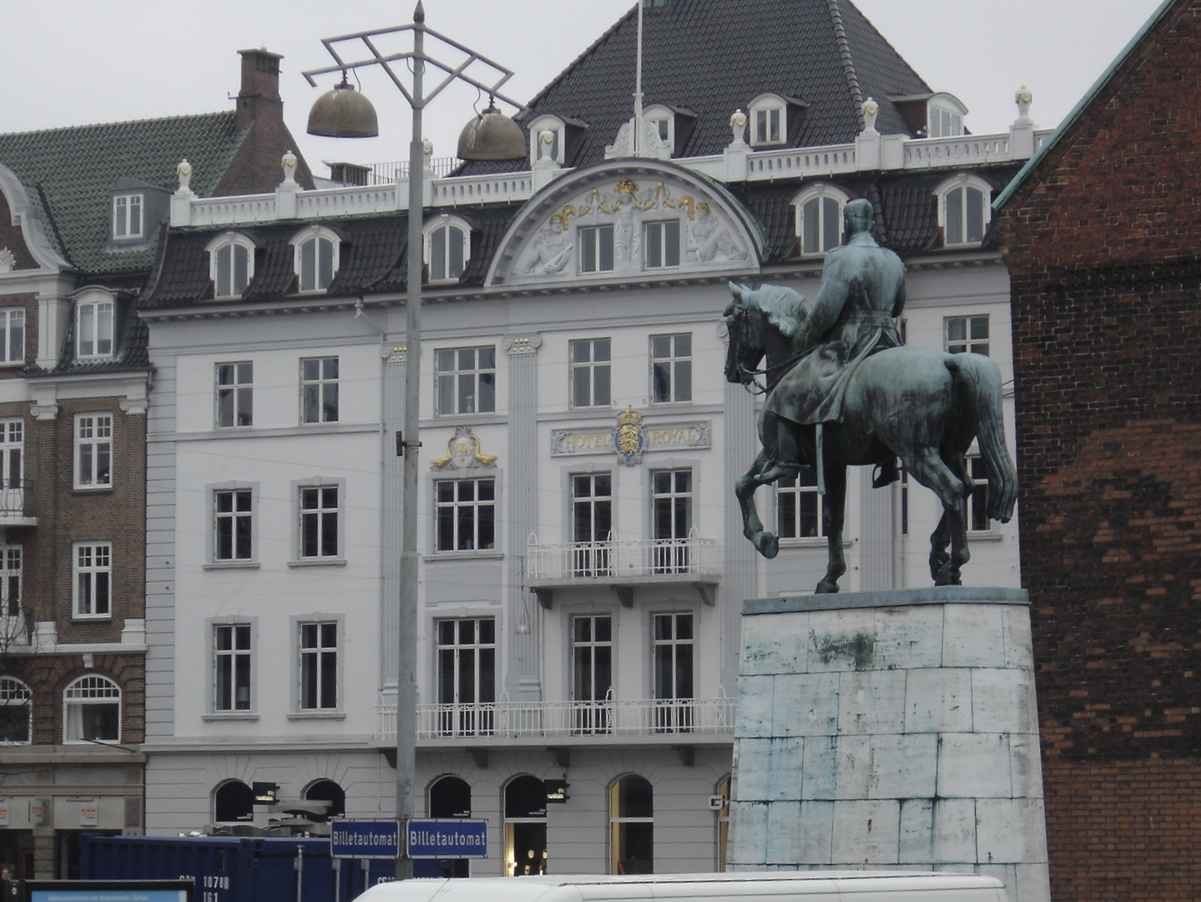
King Christian X Monument on Bispetorv, Aarhus

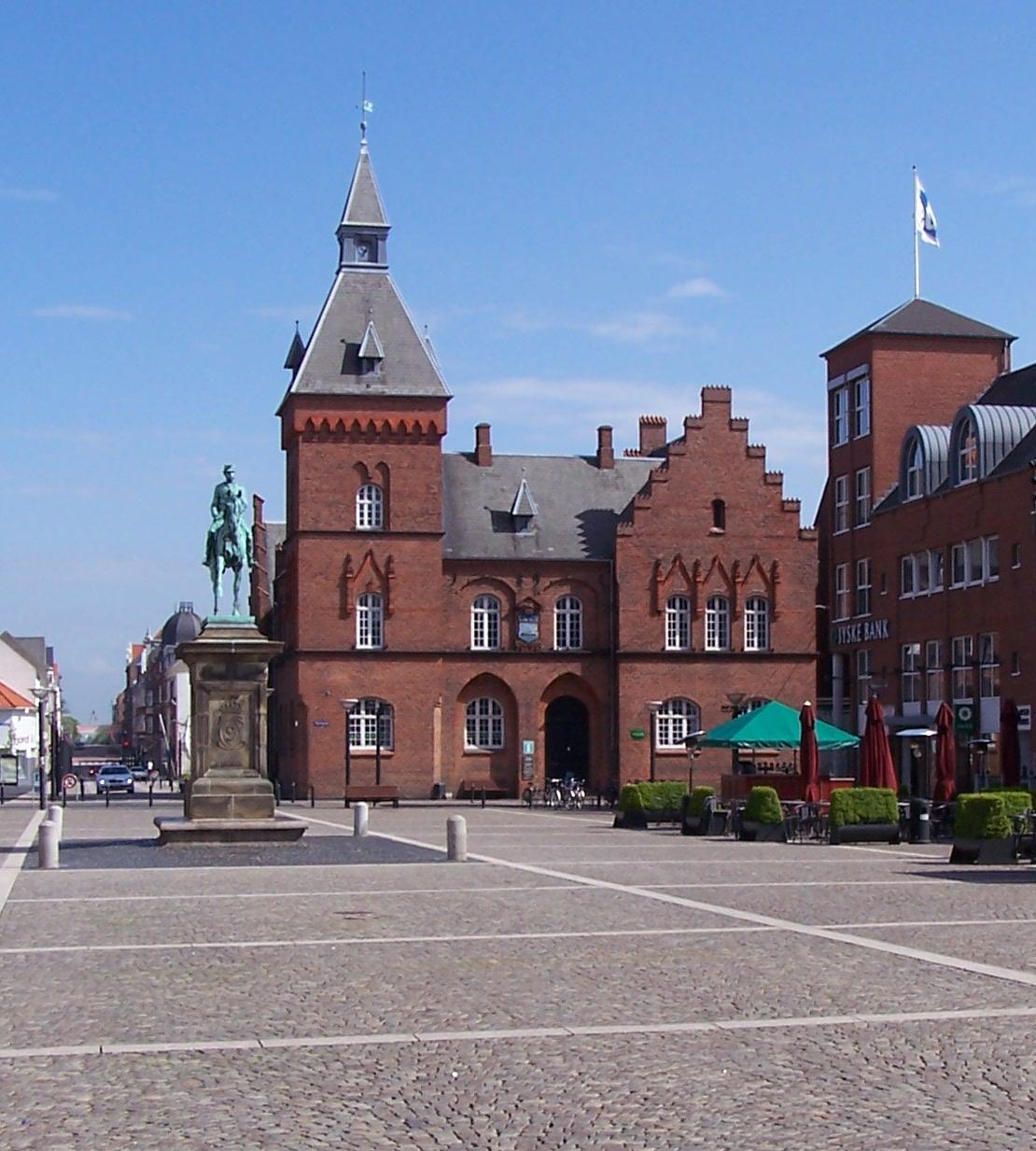
King Christian IX Monument on Esbjerg Torvet

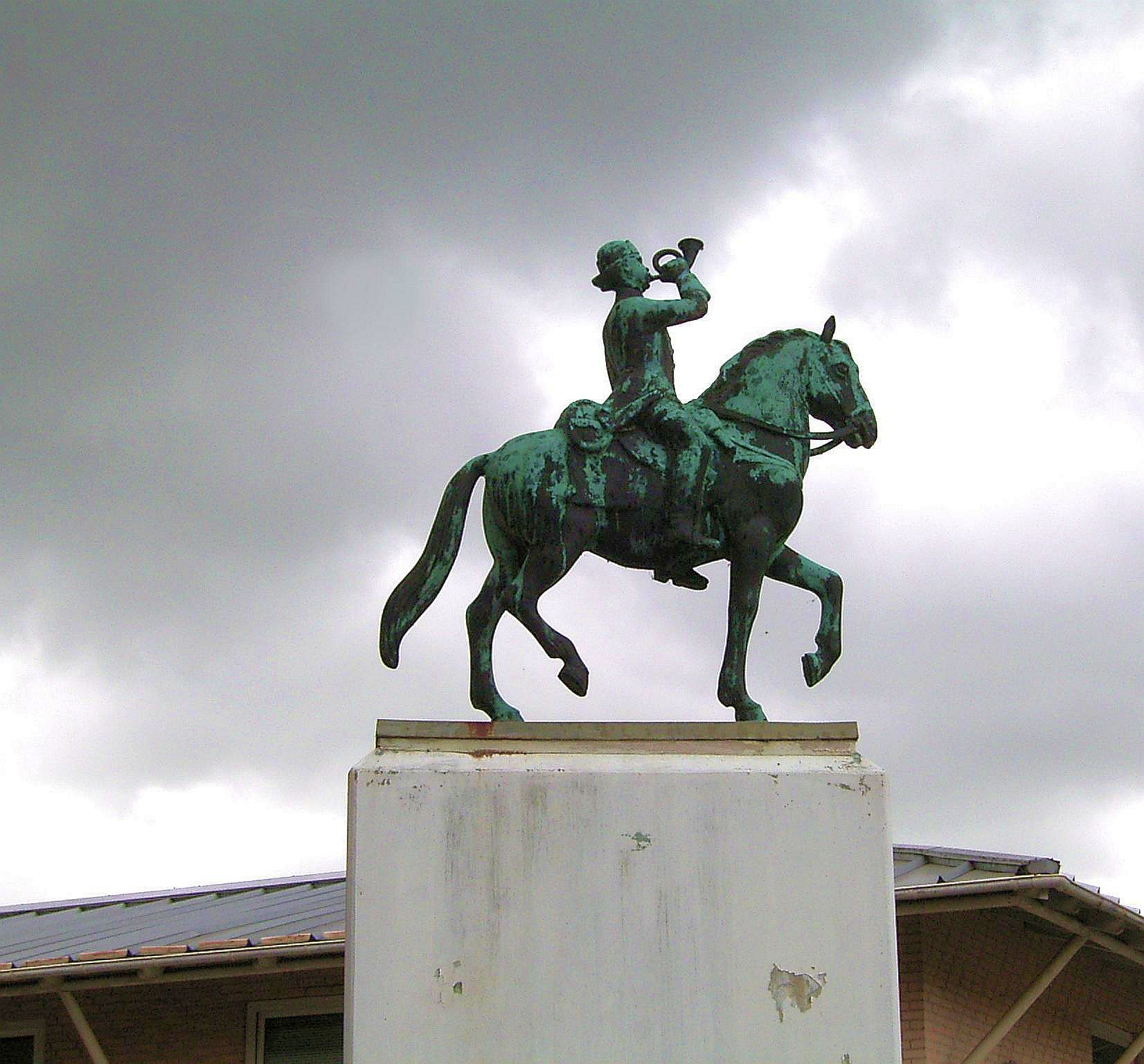
Postrytter in Hvidovre

Nakskov

- Equestrian monument of King Christian X in bronze by V. Kvederis, erected in 1952.

Odense

- Equestrian monument of King Christian IX in bronze by Aksel Hansen, erected 1912.

Slagelse

- Equestrian monument of King Christian IX in bronze by L. Brandstrup, erected 1910.

== Egypt ==
Alexandria

- Equestrian statue of Alexander the Great, 2002.
- Equestrian statue of Muhammad Ali Pasha, 1873.

Cairo

- Equestrian of Ibrahim Pasha in Cairo Citadel in front of National Military Museum, 1872.
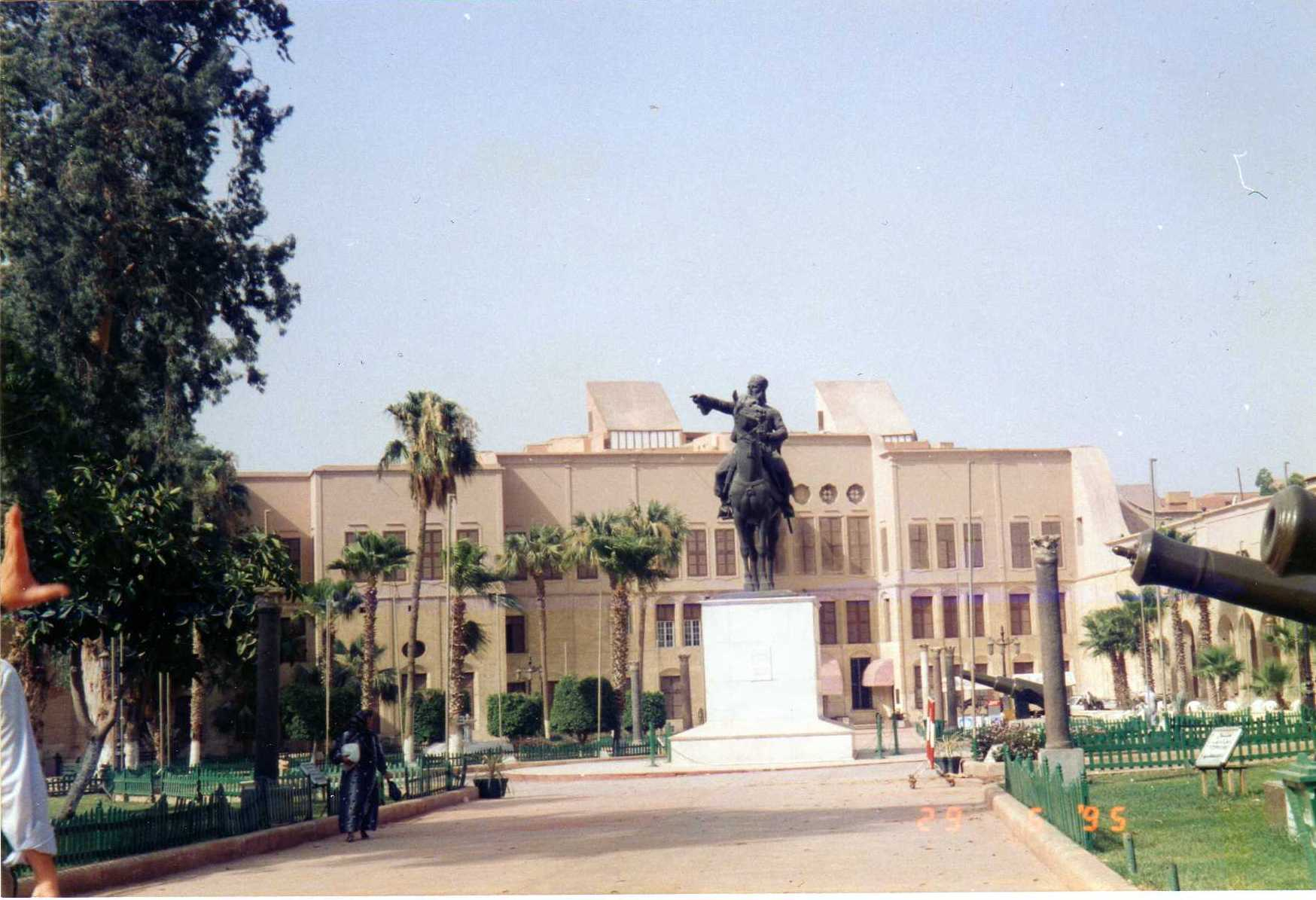
Ibrahim Pasha in Cairo

== Estonia ==
Viljandi

- Equestrian of Commander-in-chief Johan Laidoner by Terje Ojaver at the central city square, 2004.
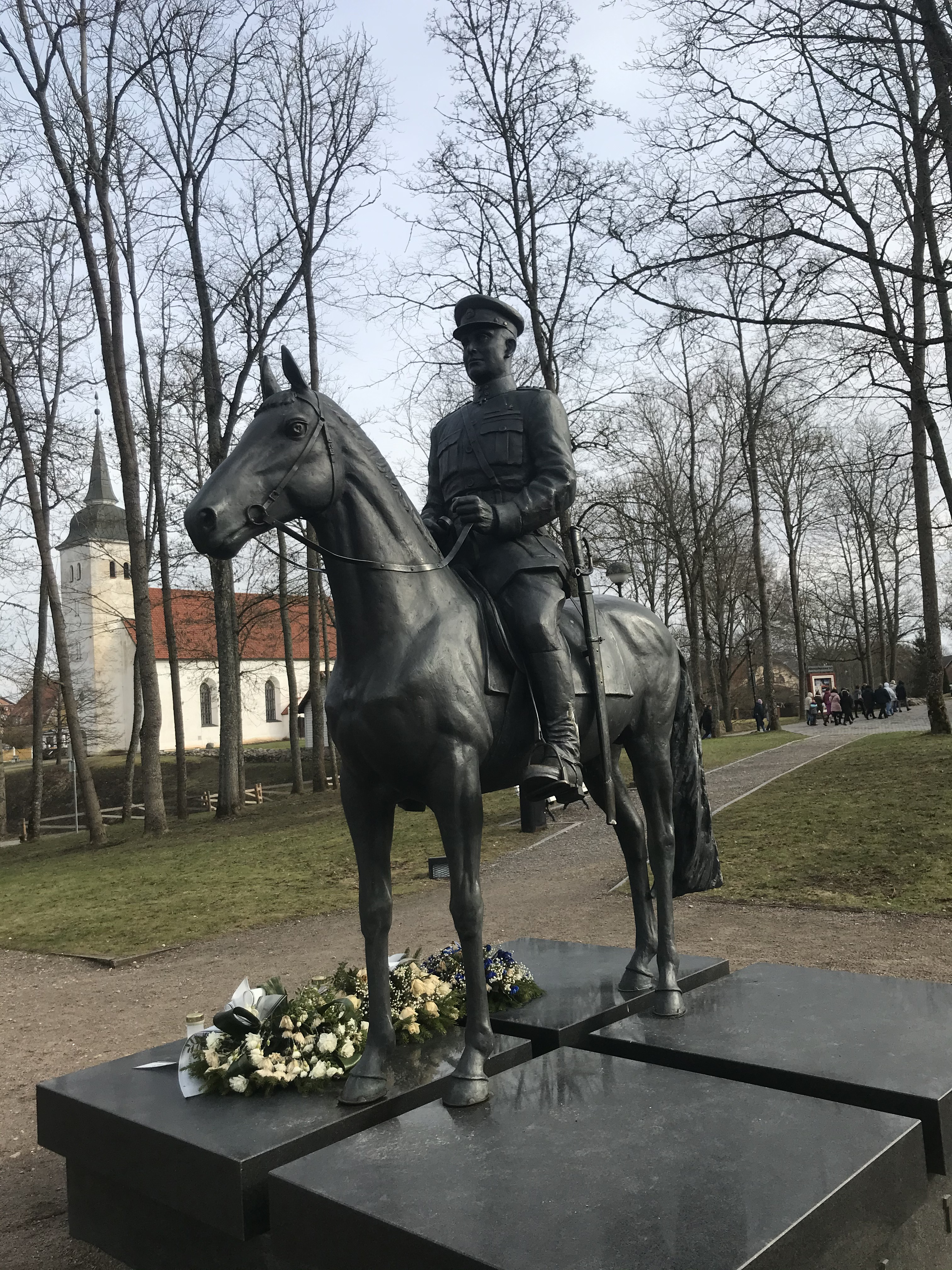
Equestrian statue of General Johan Laidoner in Viljandi, Estonia

== Ethiopia ==
Addis Abeba

- Equestrian of Emperor Menelik II at the Menelik II Square.

== Finland ==
Helsinki

- Bronze Equestrian statue of Marshal Mannerheim (C.G.E. Mannerheim, Marshal of Finland) located beside the main street Mannerheimintie in front of the Kiasma museum of modern art, by Aimo Tukiainen, erected in 1960.

Lahti

- Bronze equestrian monument of Marshal of Finland C.G.E. Mannerheim, located in Asematori square, by Veikko Leppänen, erected in 1959.
- Equestrian statue The Hakkapeliittas' homecoming, by Pentti Papinaho, erected in 1975.

Lappeenranta

- Equestrian statue Rakuunapatsas (Dragoon) by Pentti Papinaho, erected in 1982.

Rantsila

- Equestrian statue of Field Marshal Johan August Sandels, on his horse Bijou in town centre, by team of sculptors led by Martti Väänänen, erected in 1989.

== Georgia ==
Tbilisi

- Equestrian monument of King Vakhtang Gorgasali.
- Equestrian monument of King David the Builder.
- Equestrian monument of Giorgi Saakadze.
- Equestrian monument of General Petre Bagrationi.
- Freedom Monument at the Freedom Square with equestrian statue of Saint George by Zurab Tsereteli, 2006.

Kutaisi

- Equestrian monument of King David the Builder.

Poti

- Equestrian monument of Prince Tsotne Dadiani.

Telavi

- Equestrian monument of King Erekle II.
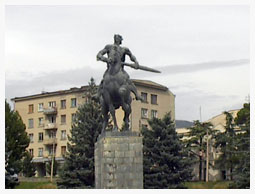
Giorgi Saakadze in Kaspi

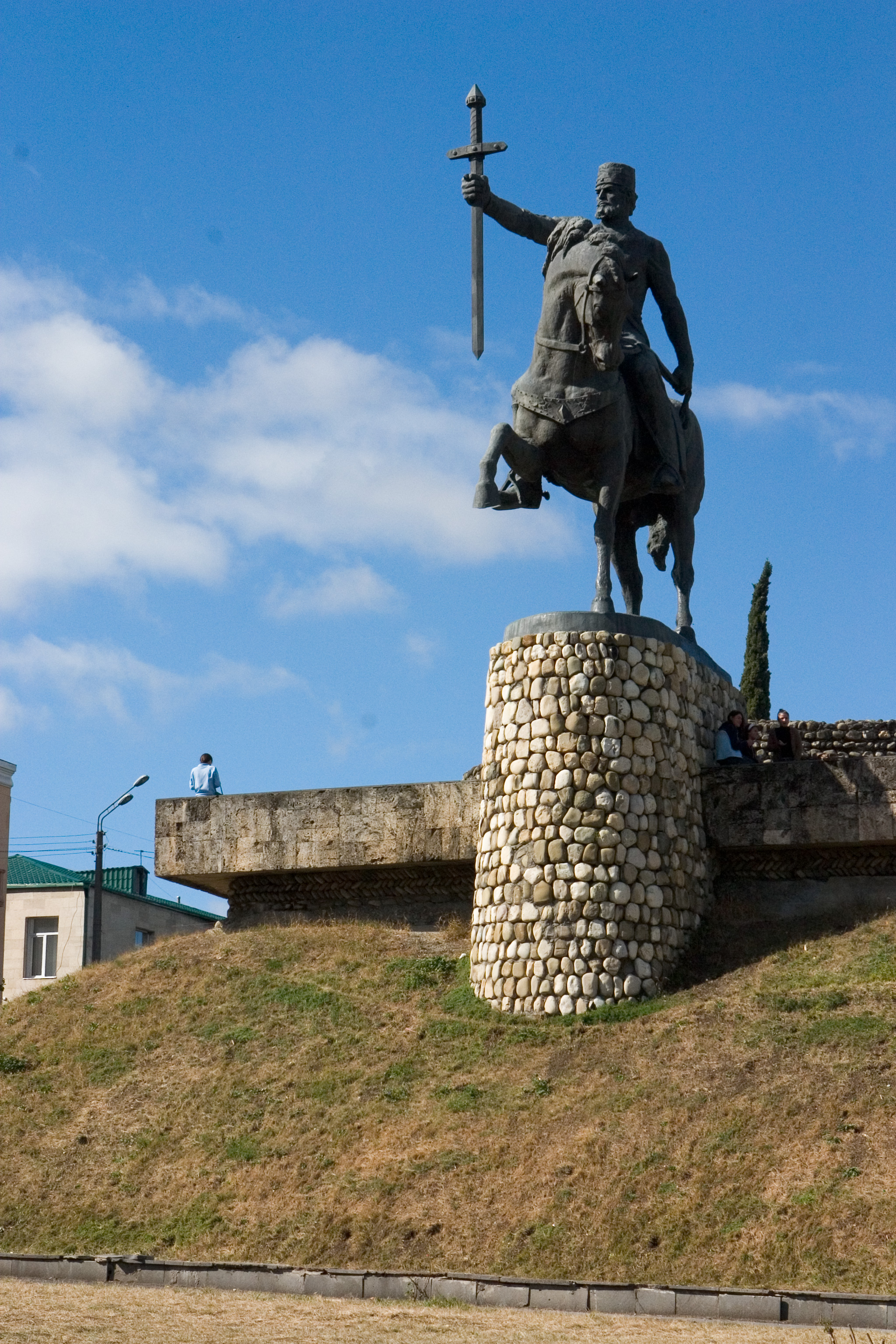
Erekle II in Telavi

== Greece ==
Athens

- Equestrian statue of King Konstantinos I at the entrance of Pedion Areos park.
- Equestrian statue of General Kolokotronis at the Old Parliament Square.
- Equestrian statue of General Papagos.
- Persian Rider, statue in the Acropolis Museum
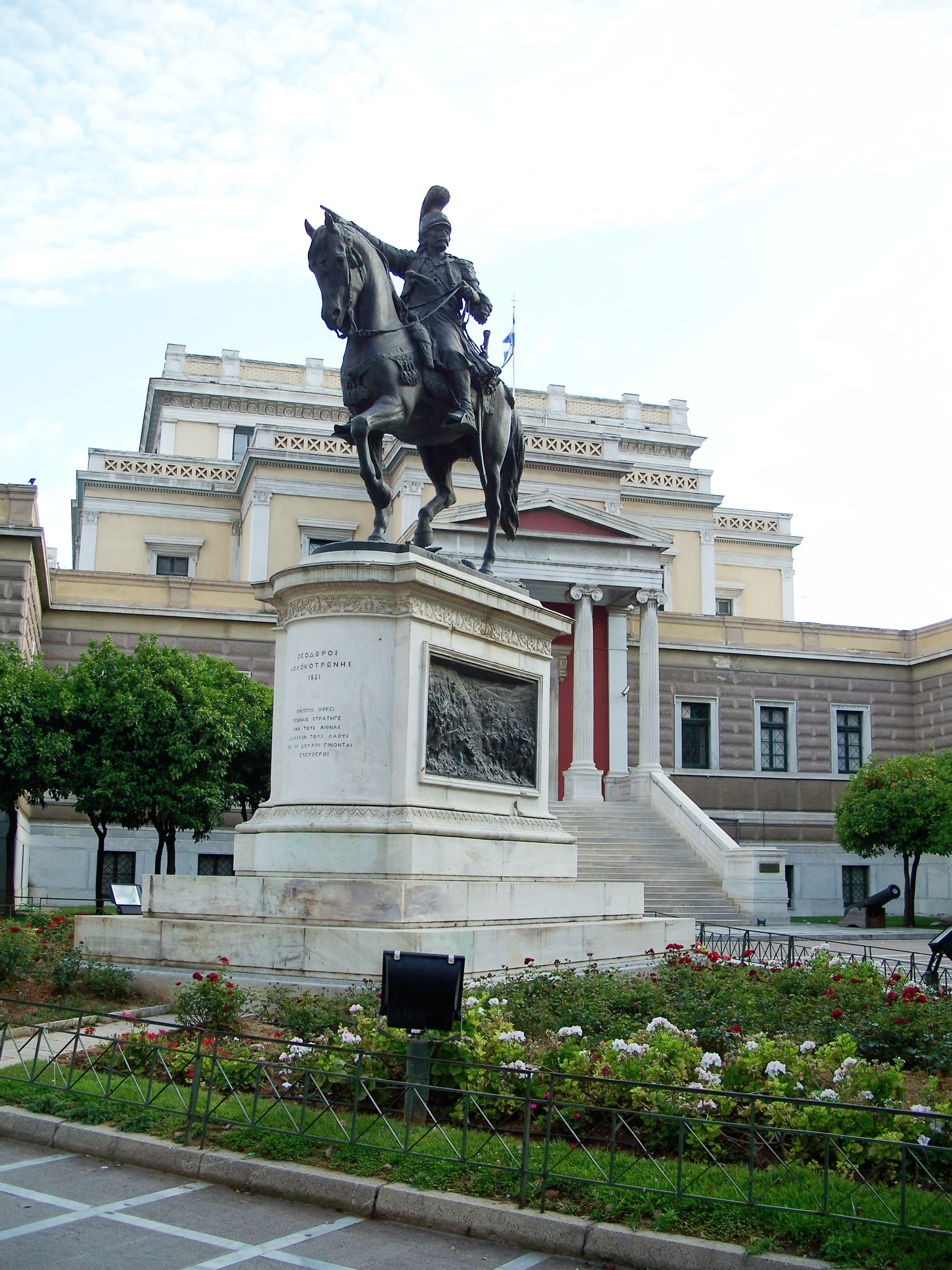
General Kolokotronis in Athens

Arta

- Equestrian statue of King Pyrrhus.

Giannitsa

- Equestrian statue of Alexander the Great in front of the Spiritual Center
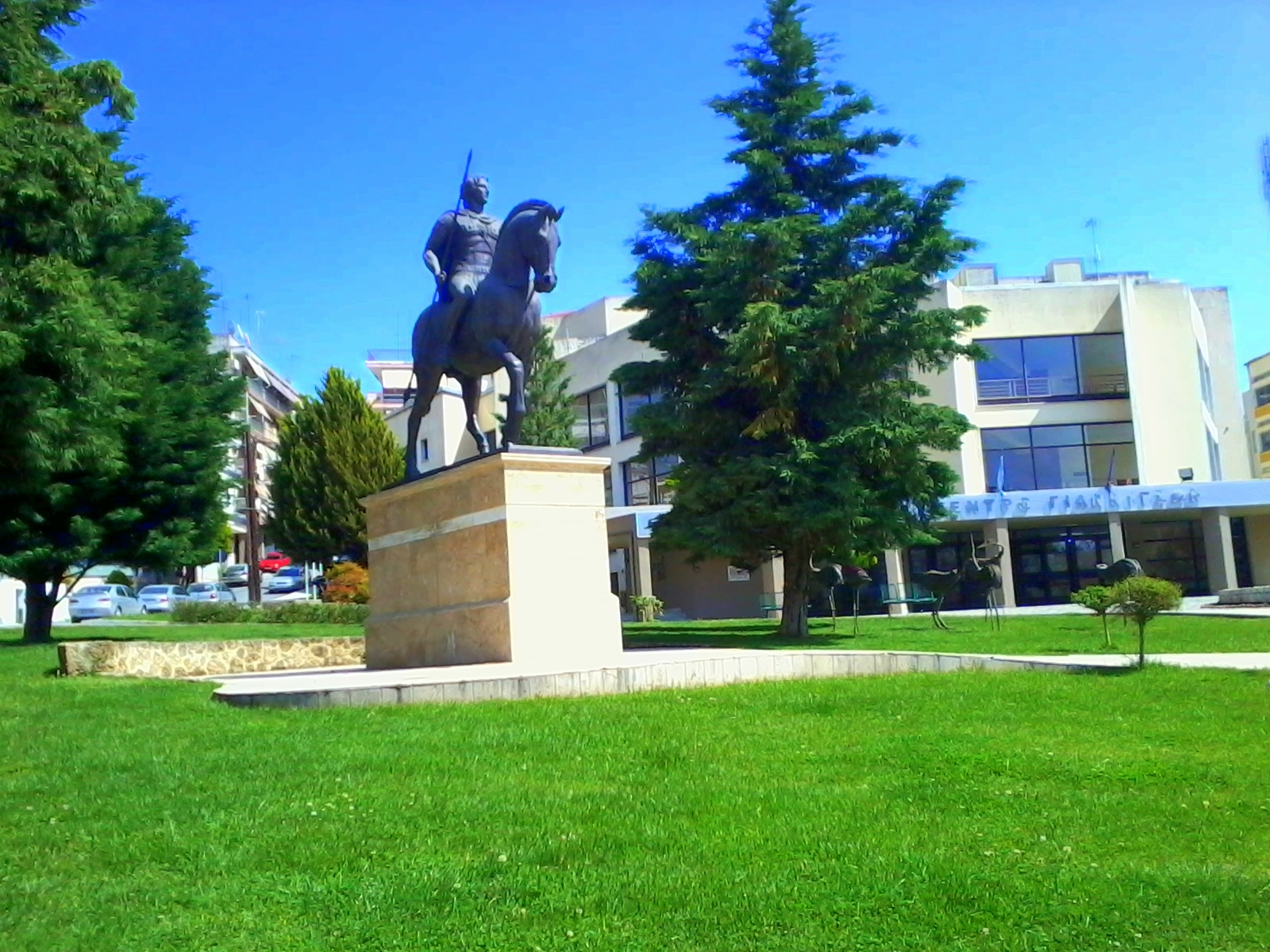
Alexander the Great in Giannitsa

Karditsa

- Equestrian statue of Nikolaos Plastiras
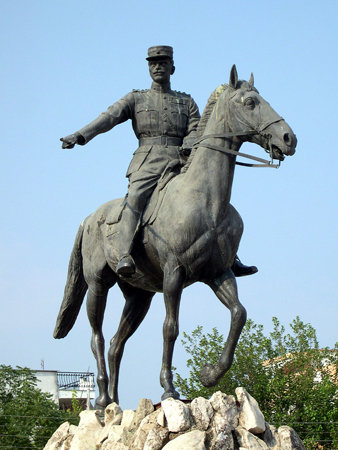
Nikolaos Plastiras in Karditsa

Kavala

- Equestrian statue of Muhammad Ali Pasha
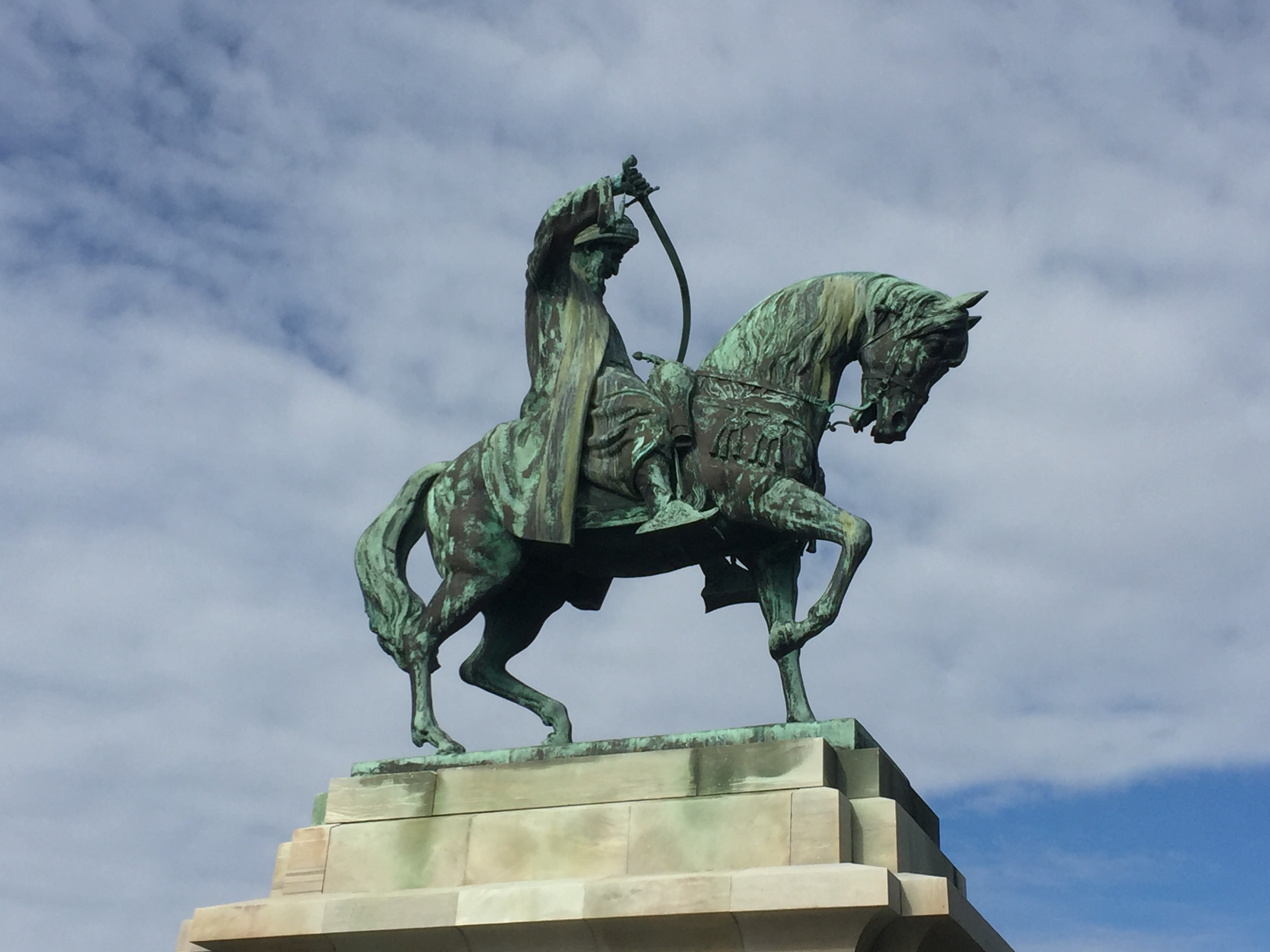
Muhammad Ali Pasha in Kavala

Pella

- Equestrian statue of Alexander the Great riding Bucephalus in Alexander the Great square
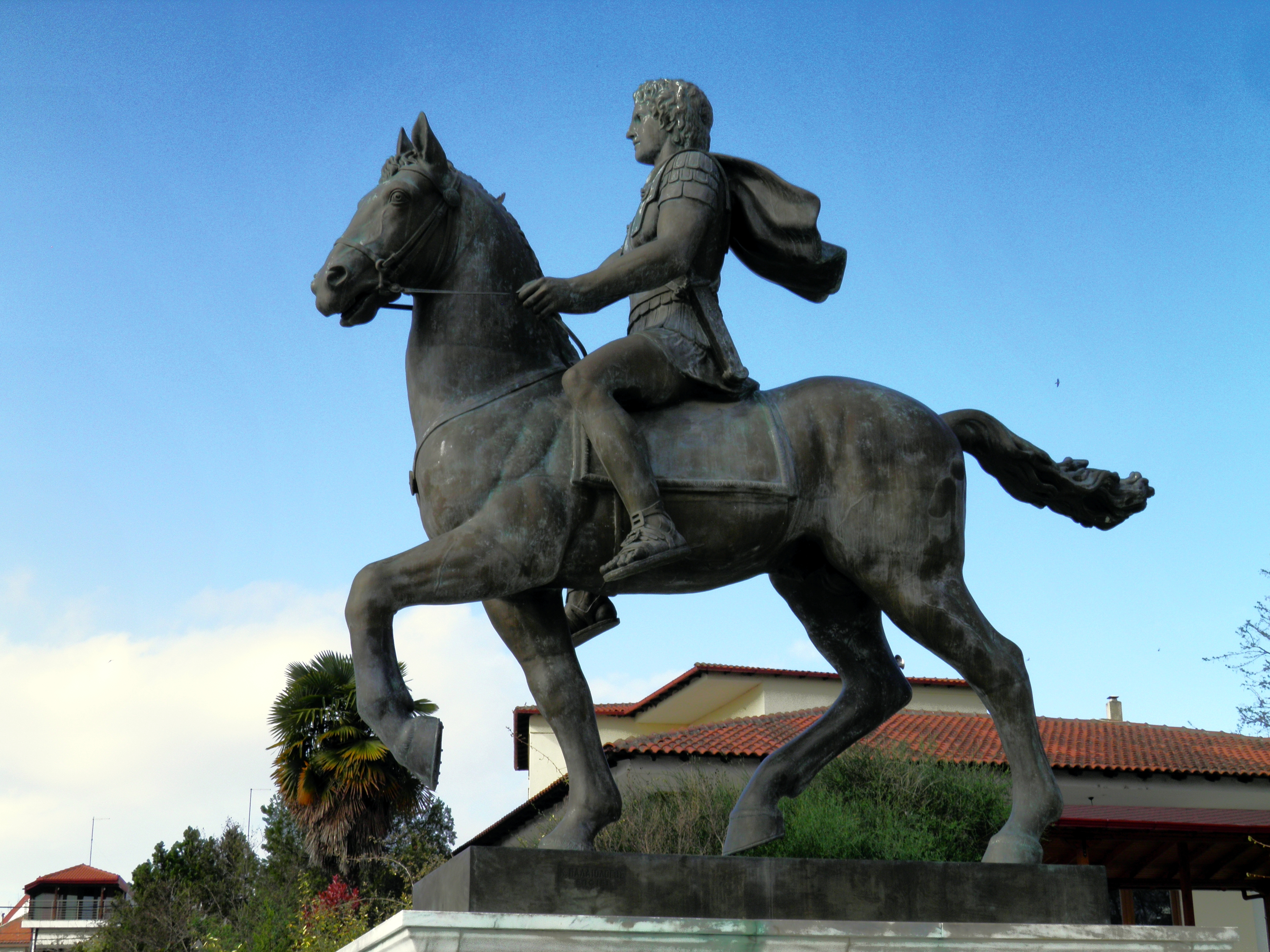
Alexander the Great in Pella

Thessaloniki

- Equestrian statue of Alexander the Great on the waterfront. Bucephalus is standing on two legs.
- Equestrian statue of King Konstantinos I at the Square of Democracy (Vardariou).

== India ==
Agra

- Equestrian statue of Rani Laxmi Bai.

Chennai

- Equestrian statue of Sir Thomas Munroe - Governor of Madras 1820–1827.
- Equestrian statue of Dheeran Chinnamalai - in Guindy, Chennai.
- Equestrian statue of Vallavaraiyan Vandiyadevan

Dhubri

- Equestrian statue of Chilarai.

Bangalore

- Equestrian statue of Sir Mark Cubbon in Cubbon Park. Location: 12.9774055°N 77.5931016°E. Ordered from Baron Maroschetti and unveiled on the 16 March 1866

Imphal

- Marjing Polo Statue
- Statue of Meidingu Nara Singh

Kolhapur

- Equestrian statue of Rani Tara Bai. Location: 16.7066646°N 74.2481509°E

Kolkata

- Edward VII memorial arch with a bronze equestrian statue of the King by Sir Bertram Mackennal close to Victoria Memorial.
- Equestrian statue of Bagha Jatin by the side of the Victoria Memorial.

Thanjavur

- Equestrian statue of Raja Raja Chola I.

Mumbai

- Equestrian statue of Chhatrapati Shivaji in Colaba.
- Equestrian statue of Chhatrapati Shivaji.

Pune

- Equestrian statue of Peshwa Baji Rao. Location: 18.5208866°N 73.8553199°E.

Punjab

- Equestrian statue of Ranjit Singh at Golden Temple complex, Amritsar.

Solapur

- Equestrian statue of Rani Laxmi Bai.

Shimla

- Equestrian statue of Rani Laxmi Bai.
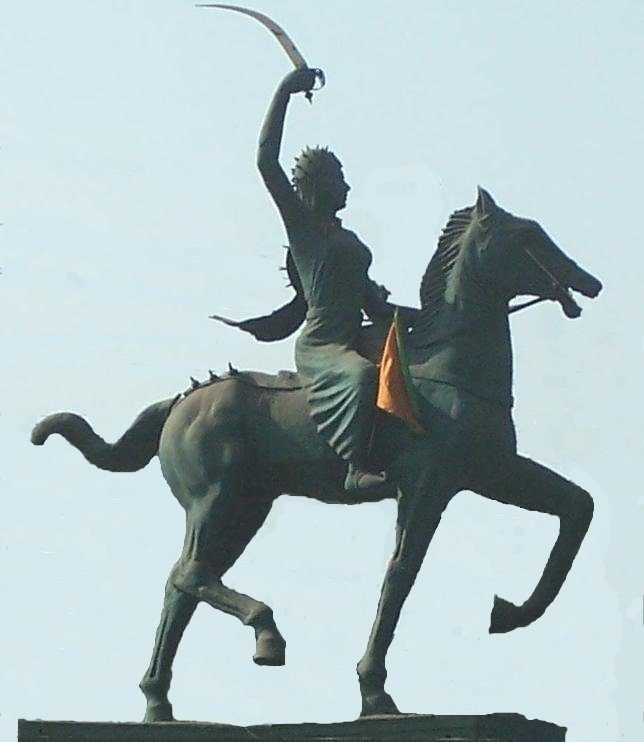
Rani Laxmi Bai in Agra

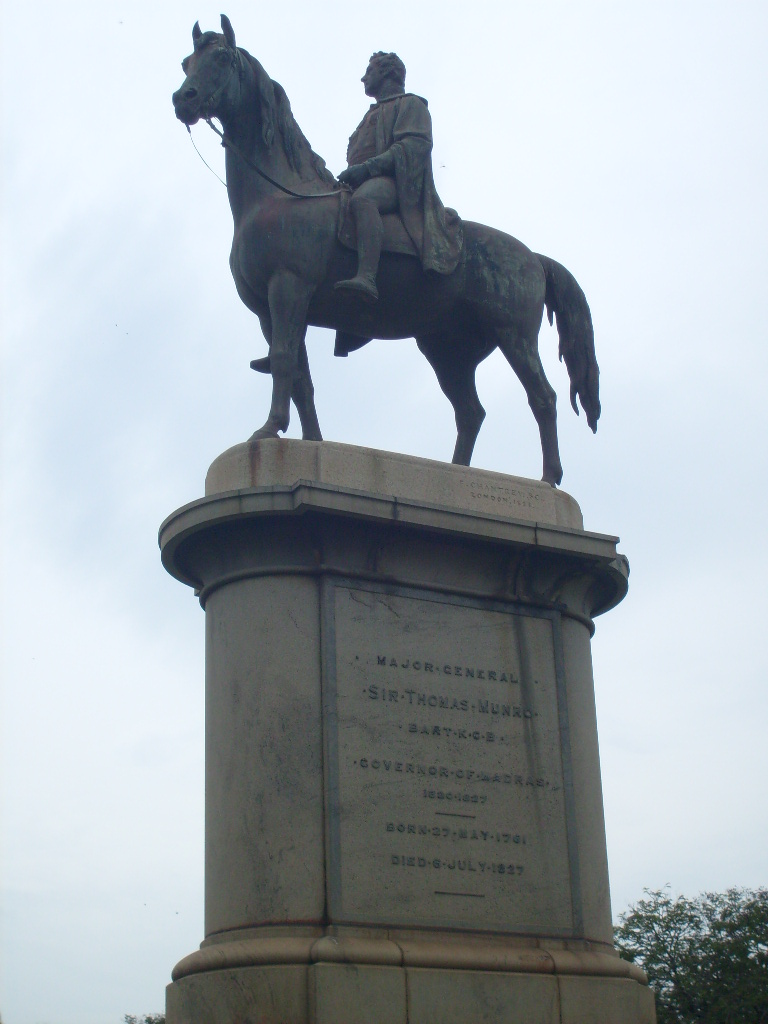
Sir Thomas Munroe - Governor of Madras 1820–1827 in Chennai

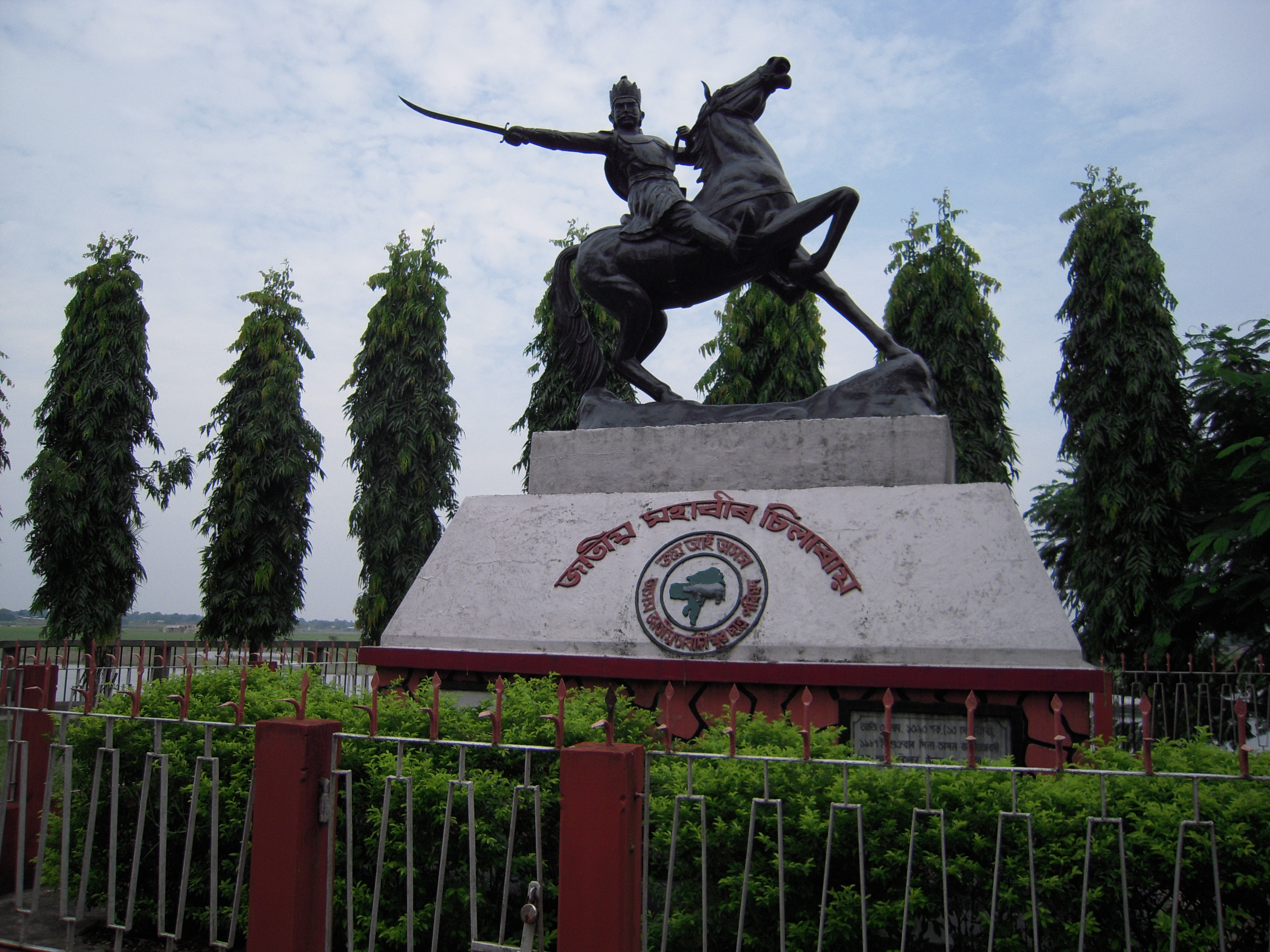
Chilarai in Dhubri

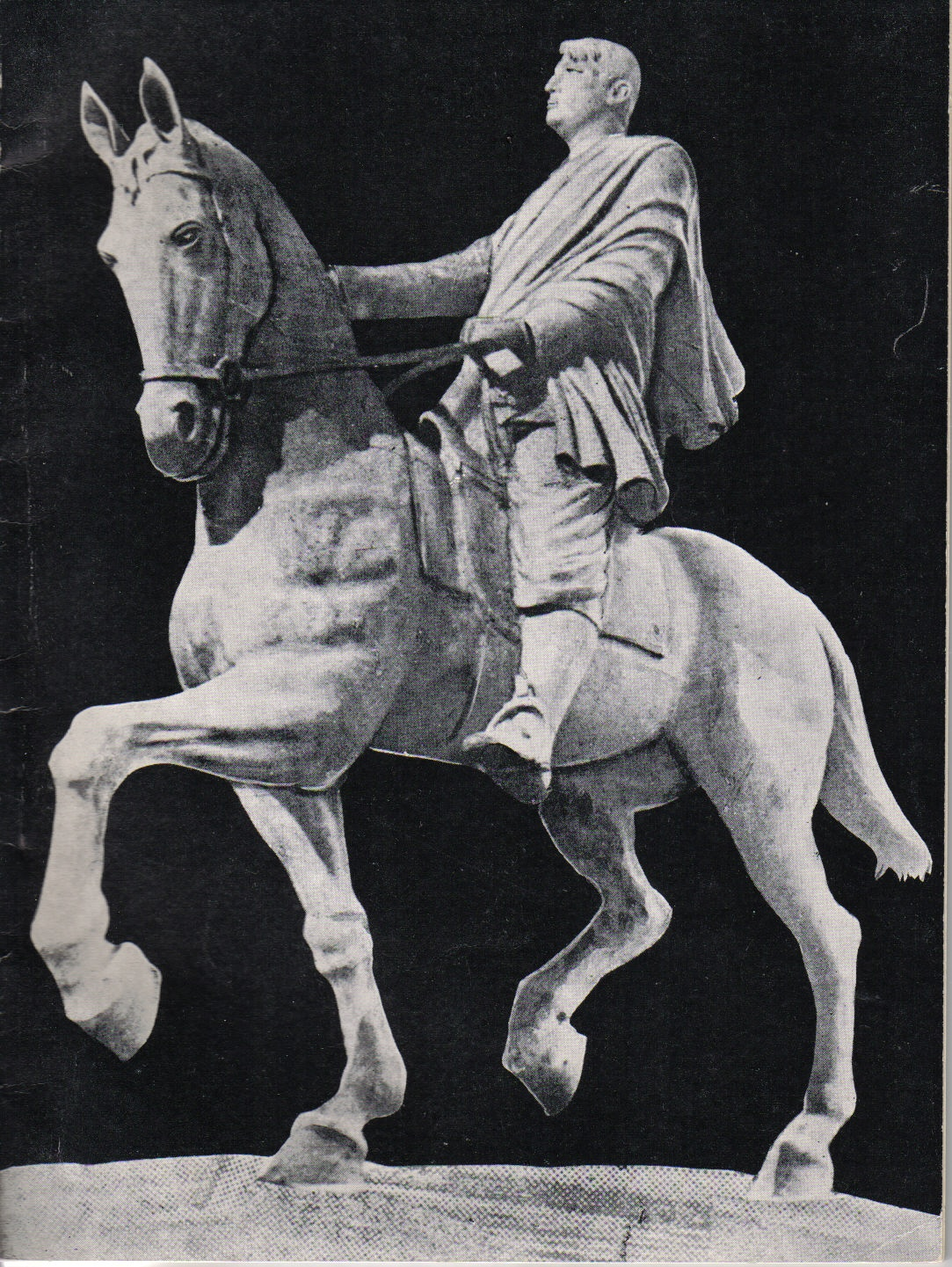
Bagha Jatin in Kolkata

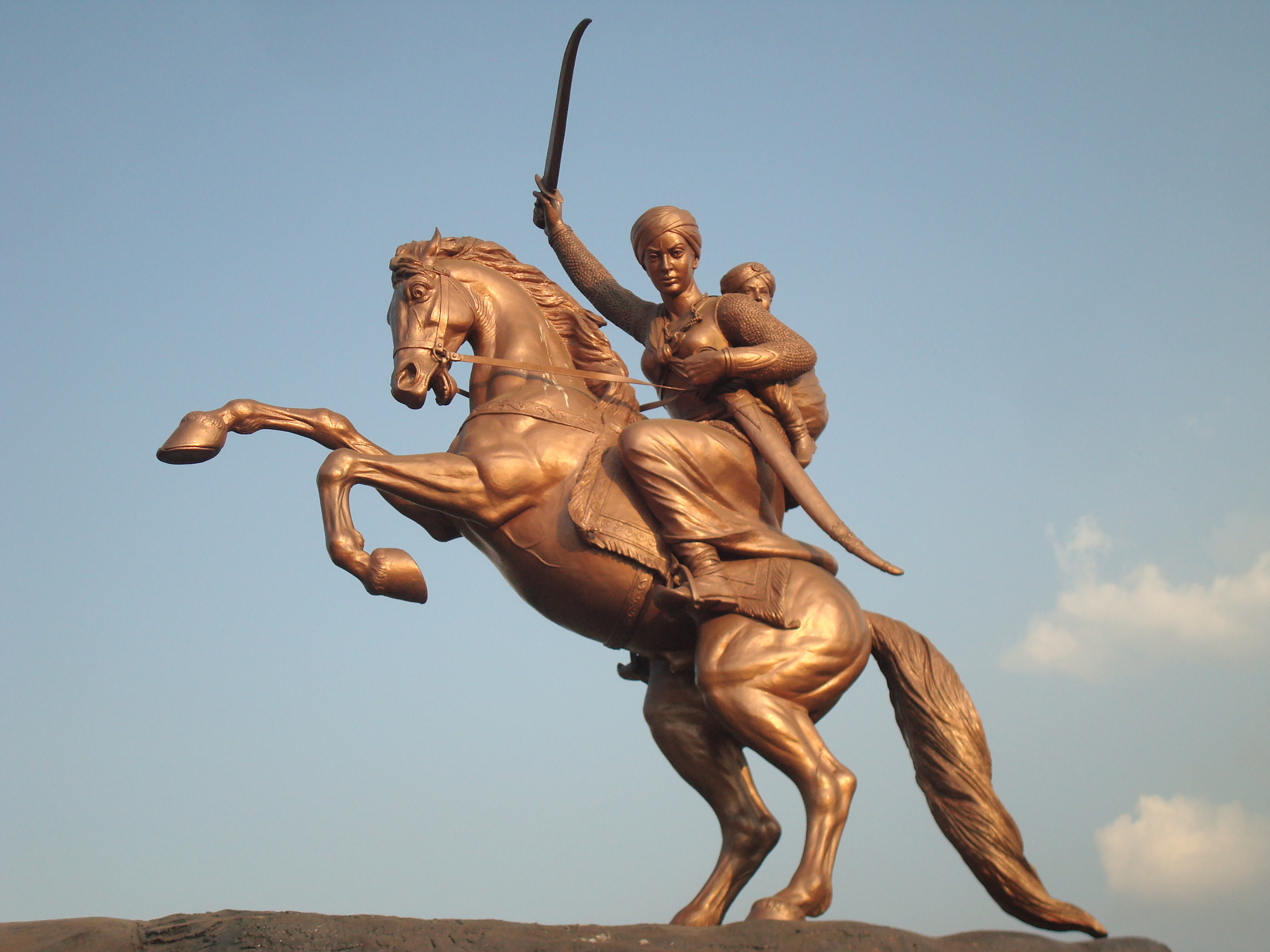
Rani Laxmi Bai in Solapur

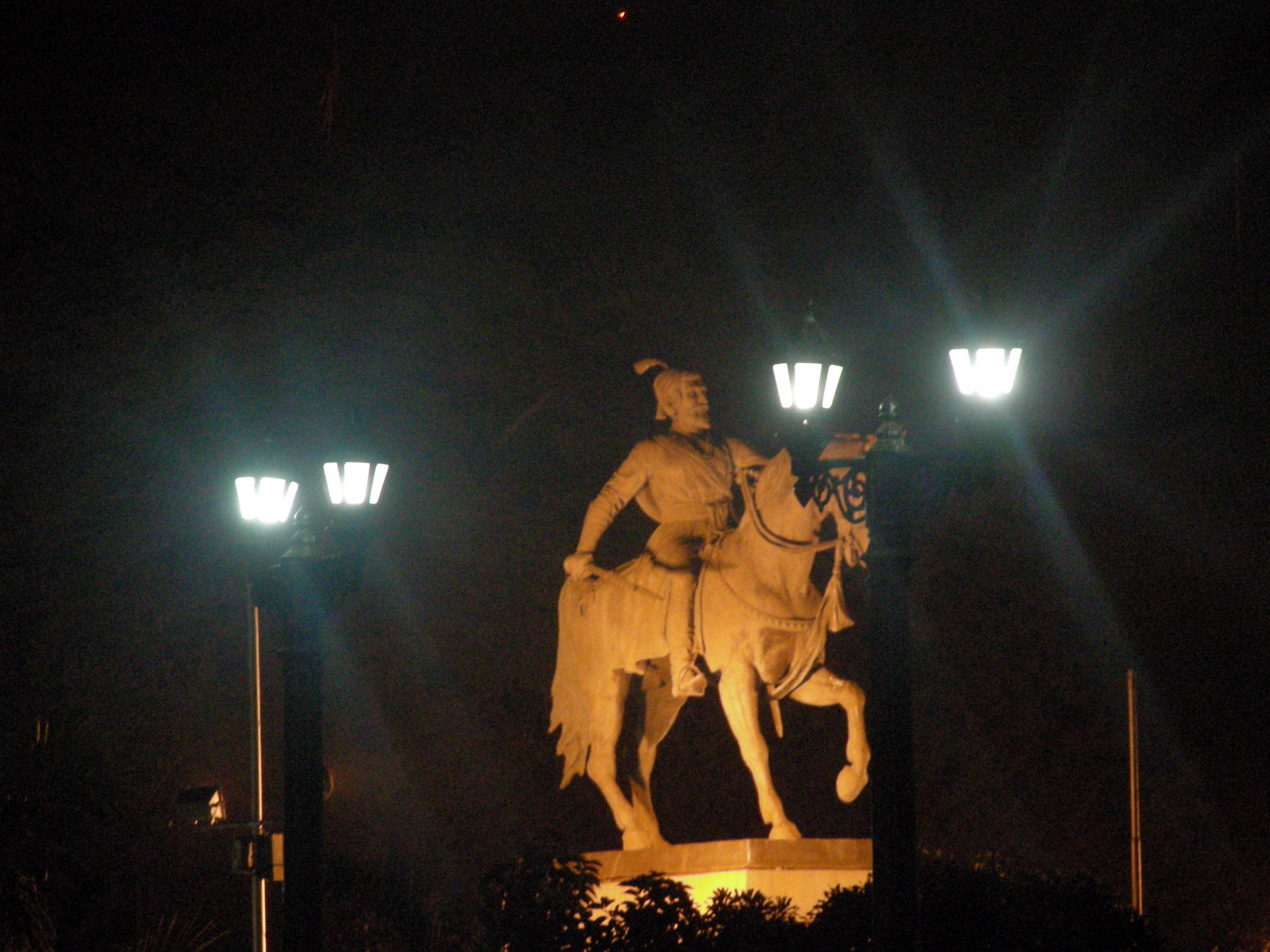
Shivaji in Colaba, Mumbai

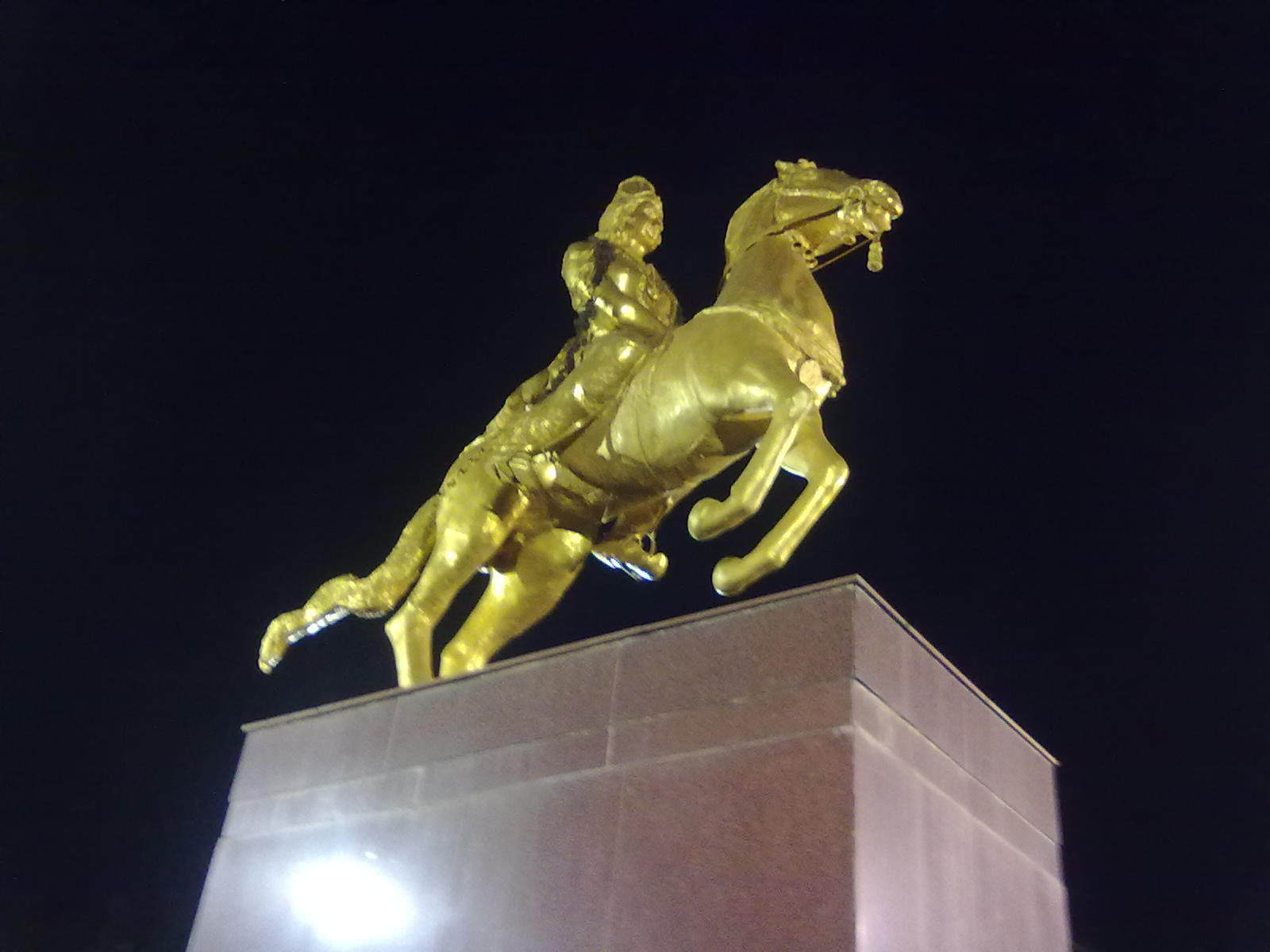
Raja Raja Chola I in Thanjavur, Tamil Nadu

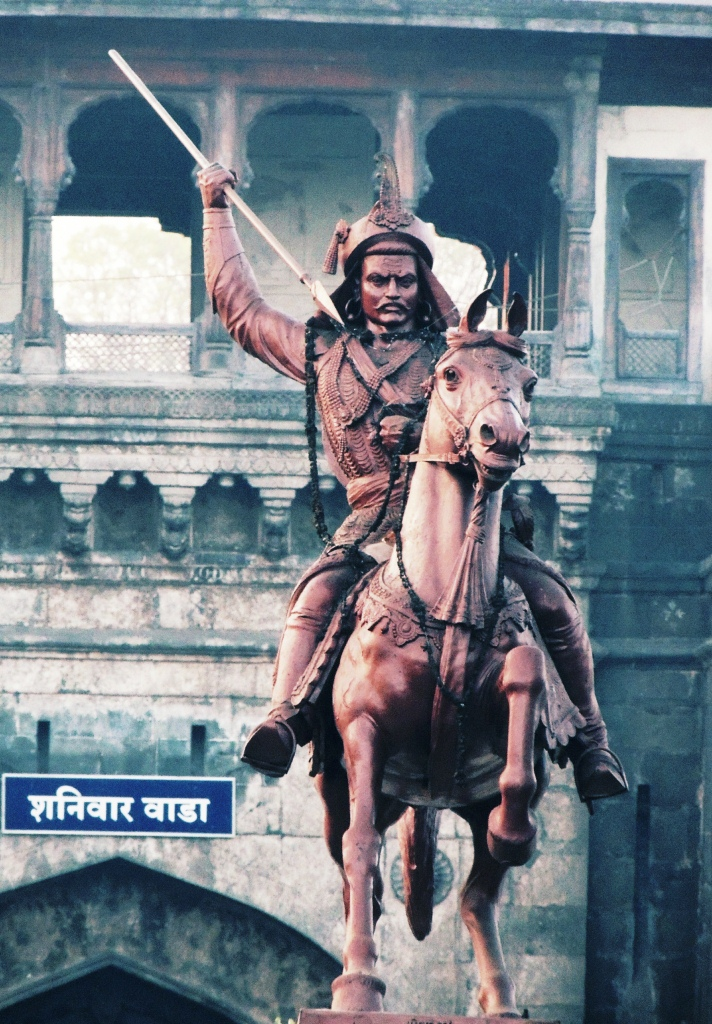
Equestrian statue of Peshwa Baji Rao I in Pune, Maharashtra

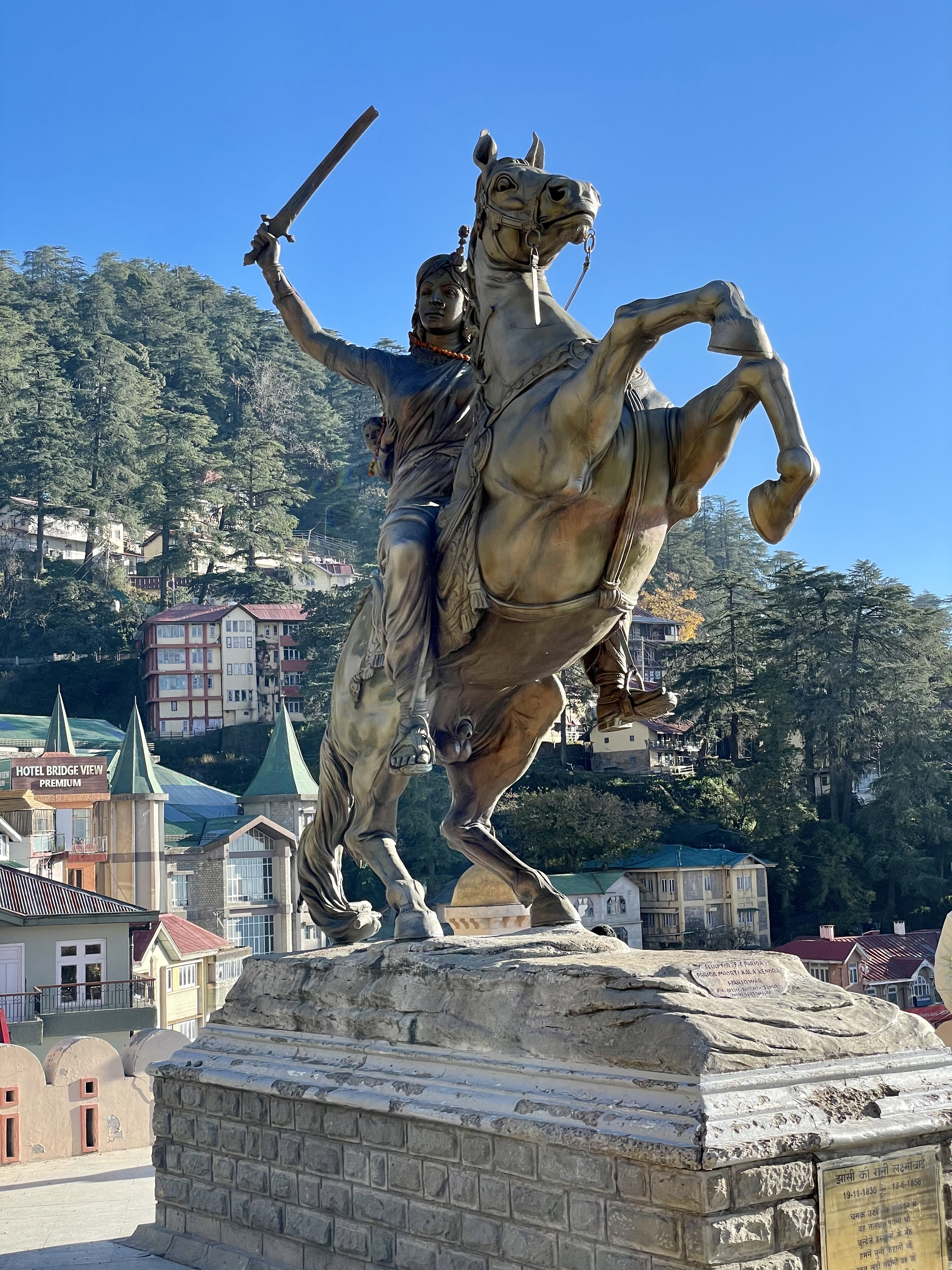
Rani Laxmi Bai in Shimla

== Indonesia ==
Jakarta

- Prince Diponegoro Monument at Merdeka Square, Jakarta.

Cilacap

- Equestrian statue of Diponegoro at Provincial Border, Cilacap.

Semarang

- Equestrian statue of Diponegoro at University of Diponegoro, Semarang.
- Equestrian statue of Diponegoro at Komando Daerah Militer, Semarang.

Salatiga

- Equestrian statue of Diponegoro at the intersection of Jl. Diponegoro and Jl. Jenderal Sudirman.

Jogjakarta

- Equestrian statue of Nyi Ageng Serang at Wates, Jakarta.

Makassar

- Equestrian statue of Sultan Hasanudin at Hasanudin Airport, Makassar.

Magelang

- Equestrian statue of Pangeran Diponegoro at Alun-alun Magelang (Magelang city square).

The equestrian statue of Pangeran Diponegoro became the symbol of military territorial command of Central Java, hence the name Kodam Diponegoro. As a result, almost in every main road provincial borders between Central Java Province with its adjacent provinces such as West and East Java provinces, stood those equestrian statues.

== Iran ==
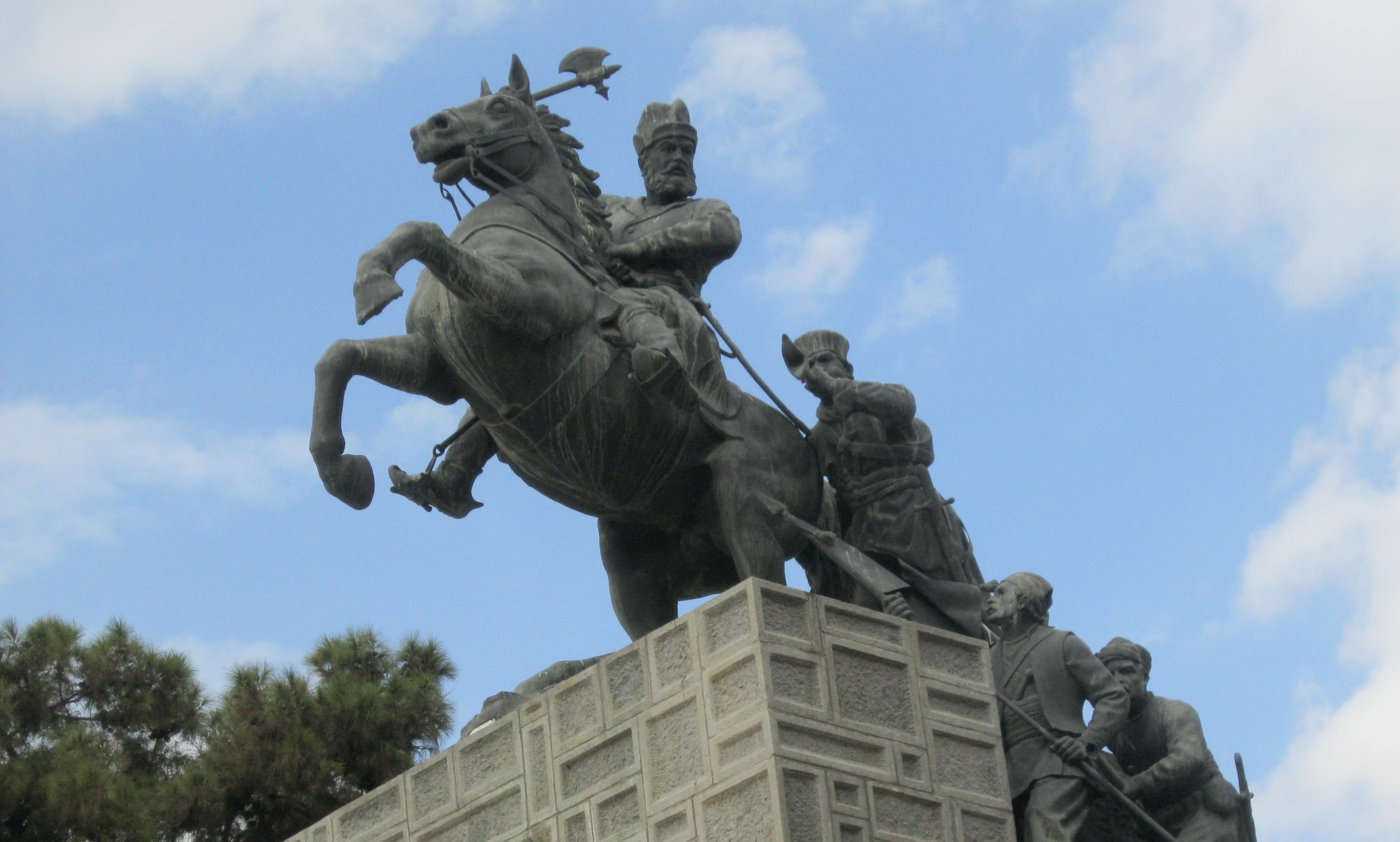
Statue of Nader Shah, the founder of the Afsharid dynasty. – Naderi Museum

Mashhad

- Bronze Statue of Nader Shah at Nader's mausoleum by Abolhassan Khan Sadighi, 1956.

Zabol

- Bronze statue of Yaqub-e Layth at Central Square of the city, by Abolhassan Khan Sadighi, 1977.

== Iraq ==
Baghdad

- Equestrian statue of Faisal I of Iraq, 1933.

== Ireland ==
Boyle

- Gaelic Chieftain by Maurice Harron at the Curlew Pass, in site of the Battle of Curlew Pass, 1999.
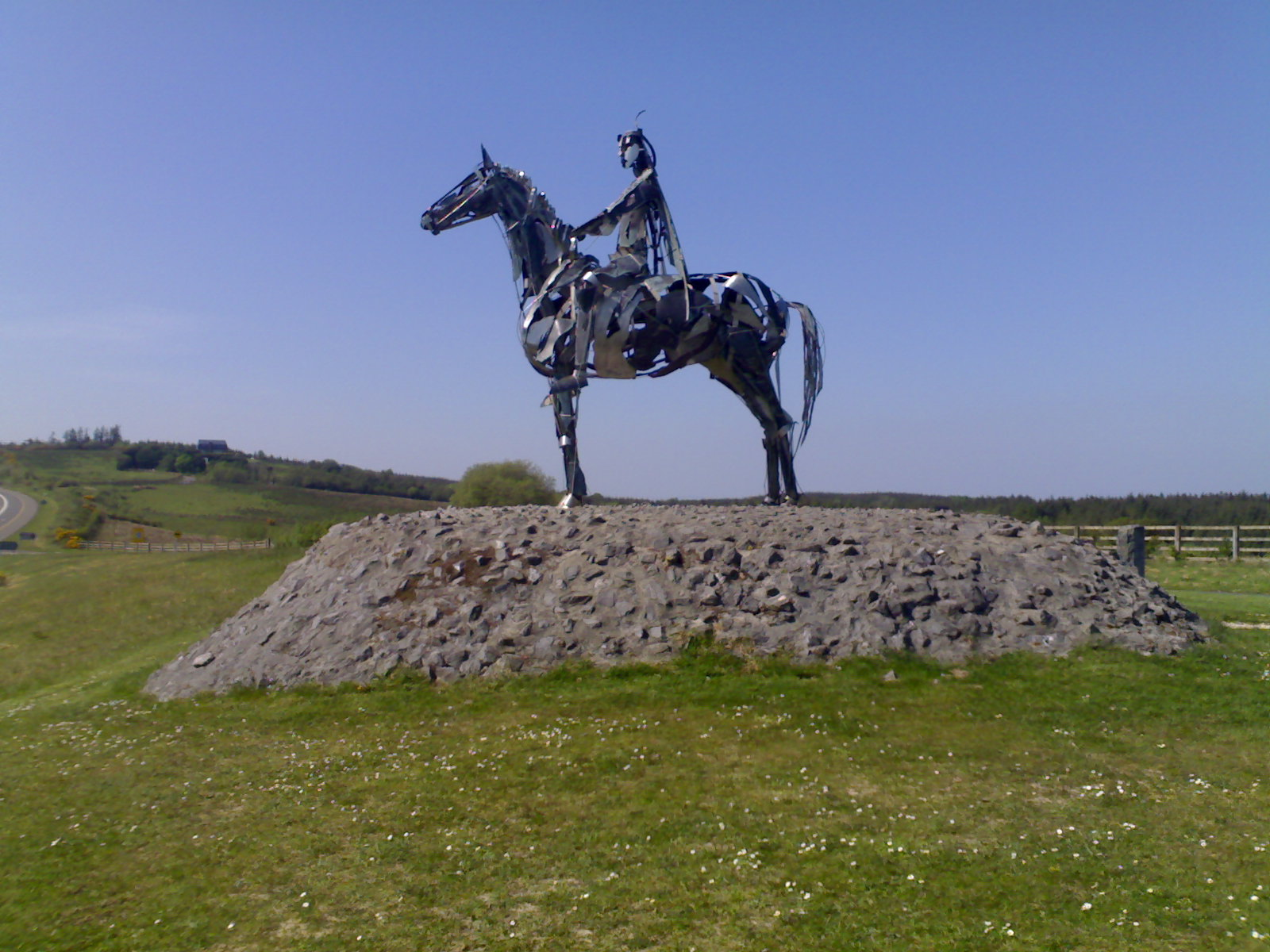
Gaelic Chieftain near Boyle

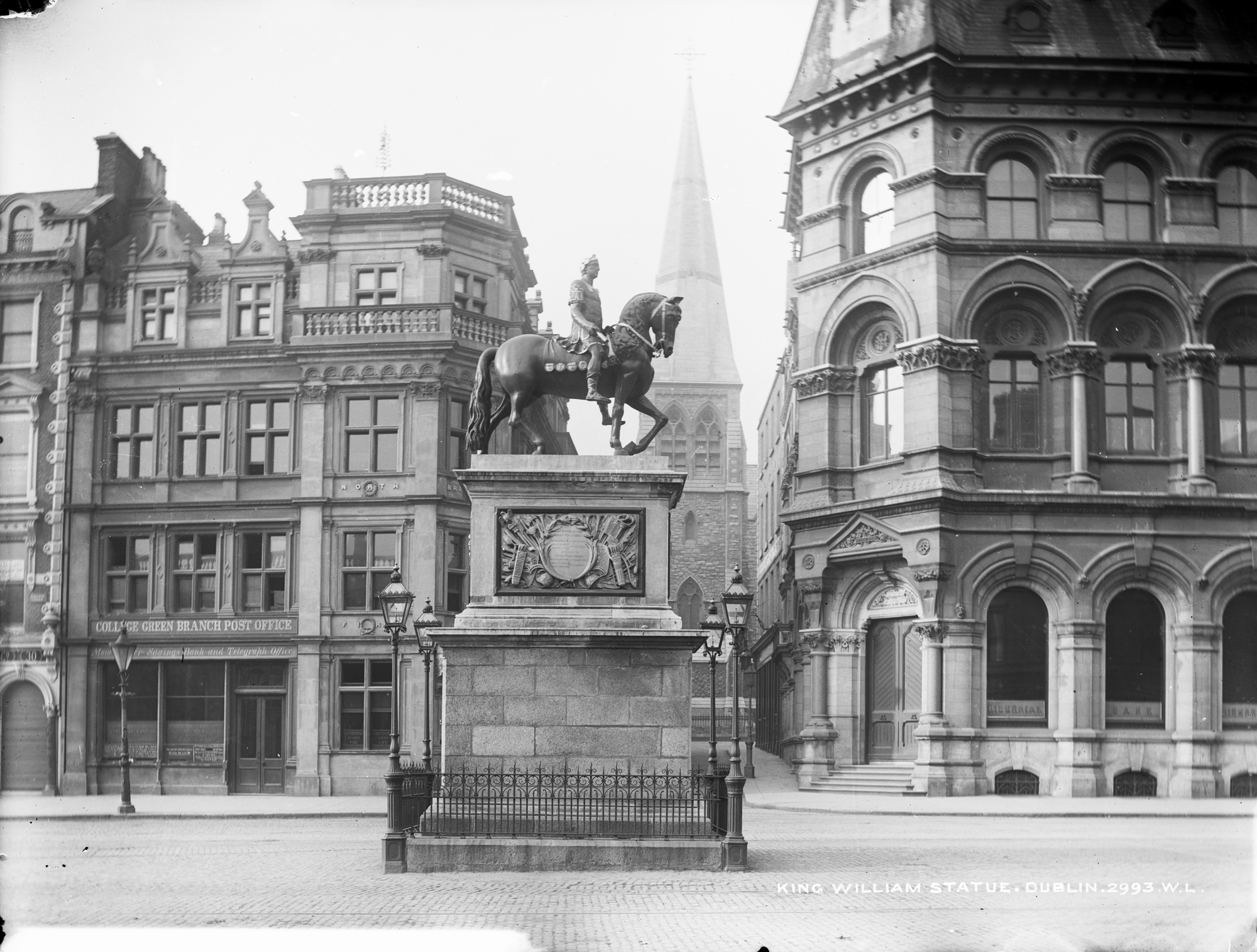
Statue of William of Orange formerly located on College Green, in Dublin. Erected in 1701, it was destroyed in 1929.

== Israel ==
Hurfeish

- Equestrian statue of Sultan al-Atrash.

Jerusalem

- Monument to Sultan of Egypt and Syria Saladin.

Kfar Tavor

- Monument to village founders.

Kiryat Tiv'on

- Monument in memory of Alexander Zaid near Beit She'arim National Park, statue by David Polus.

Tel Aviv

- Monument of Meir Dizengoff, first Mayor of Tel Aviv, on Rothschild Boulevard (near Dizengoff's home, now a museum), by David Zundelovich.

Mikve Israel

- Monument of German Emperor Wilhelm the Second meeting Zionist leader Theodor Herzl.
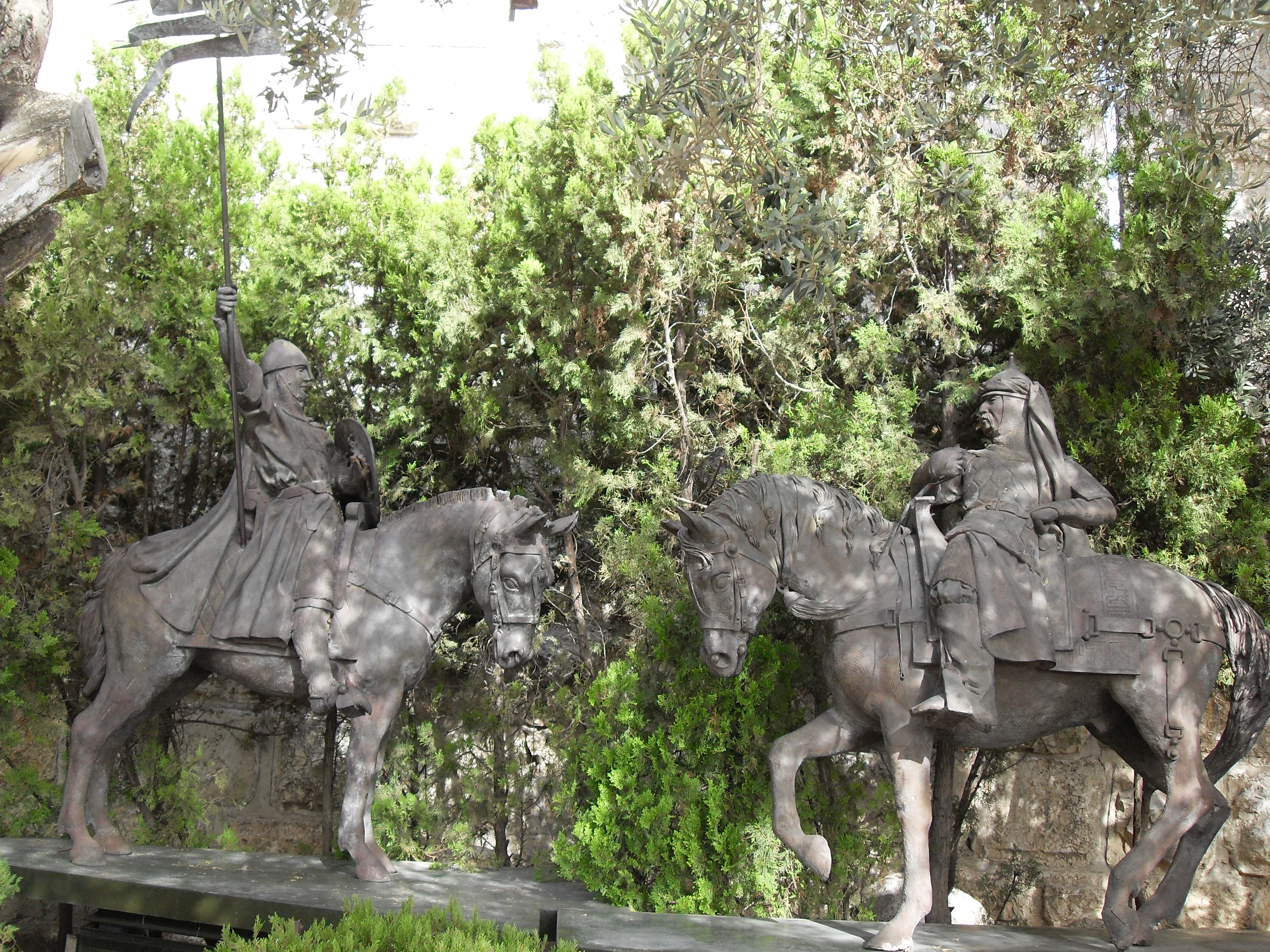
Statue of Saladin and Richard the Lionheart, Jerusalem

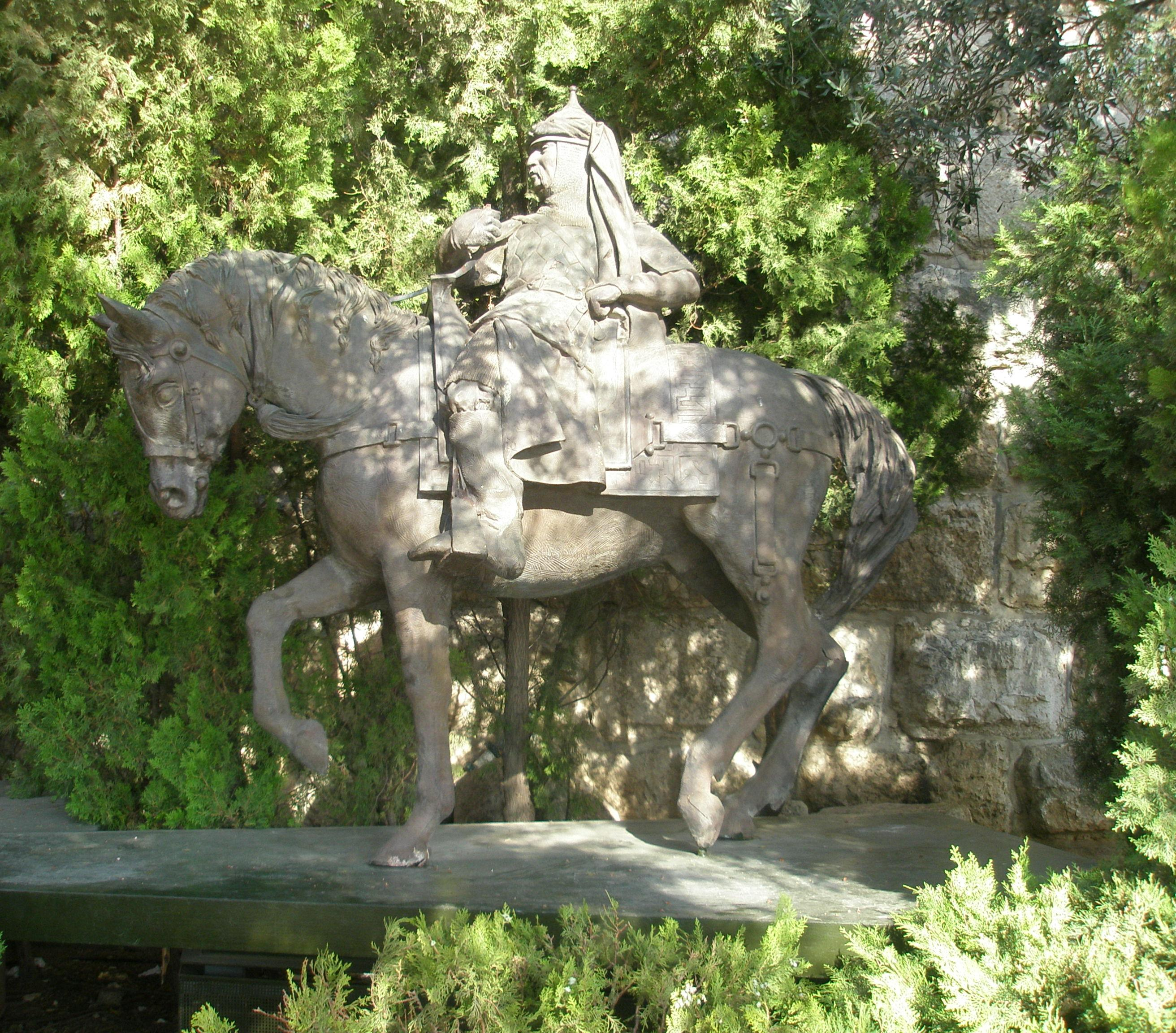
Statue of Saladin, Jerusalem

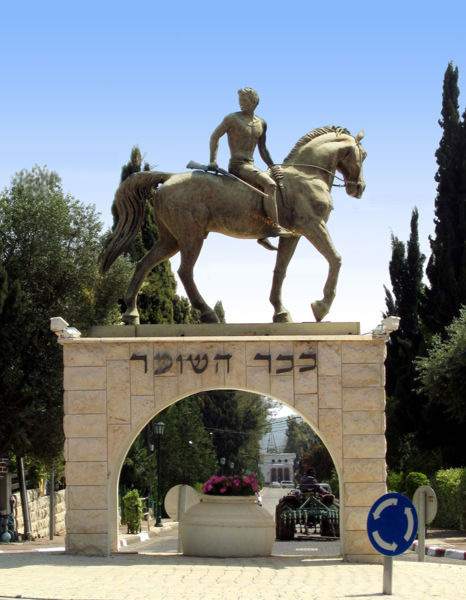
Equestrian statue in Kfar Tavor

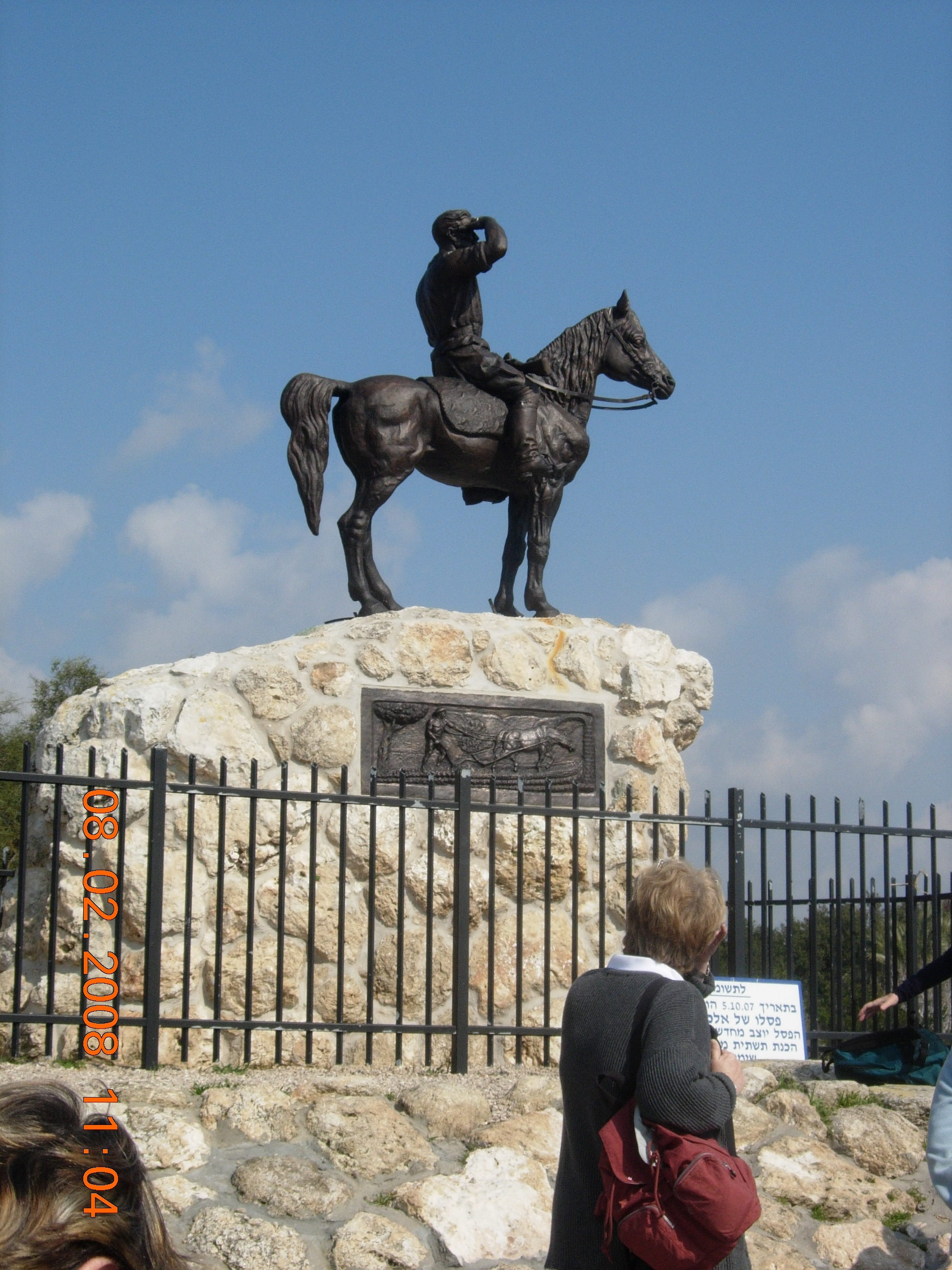
Alexander Zaid at the Jezreel Valley

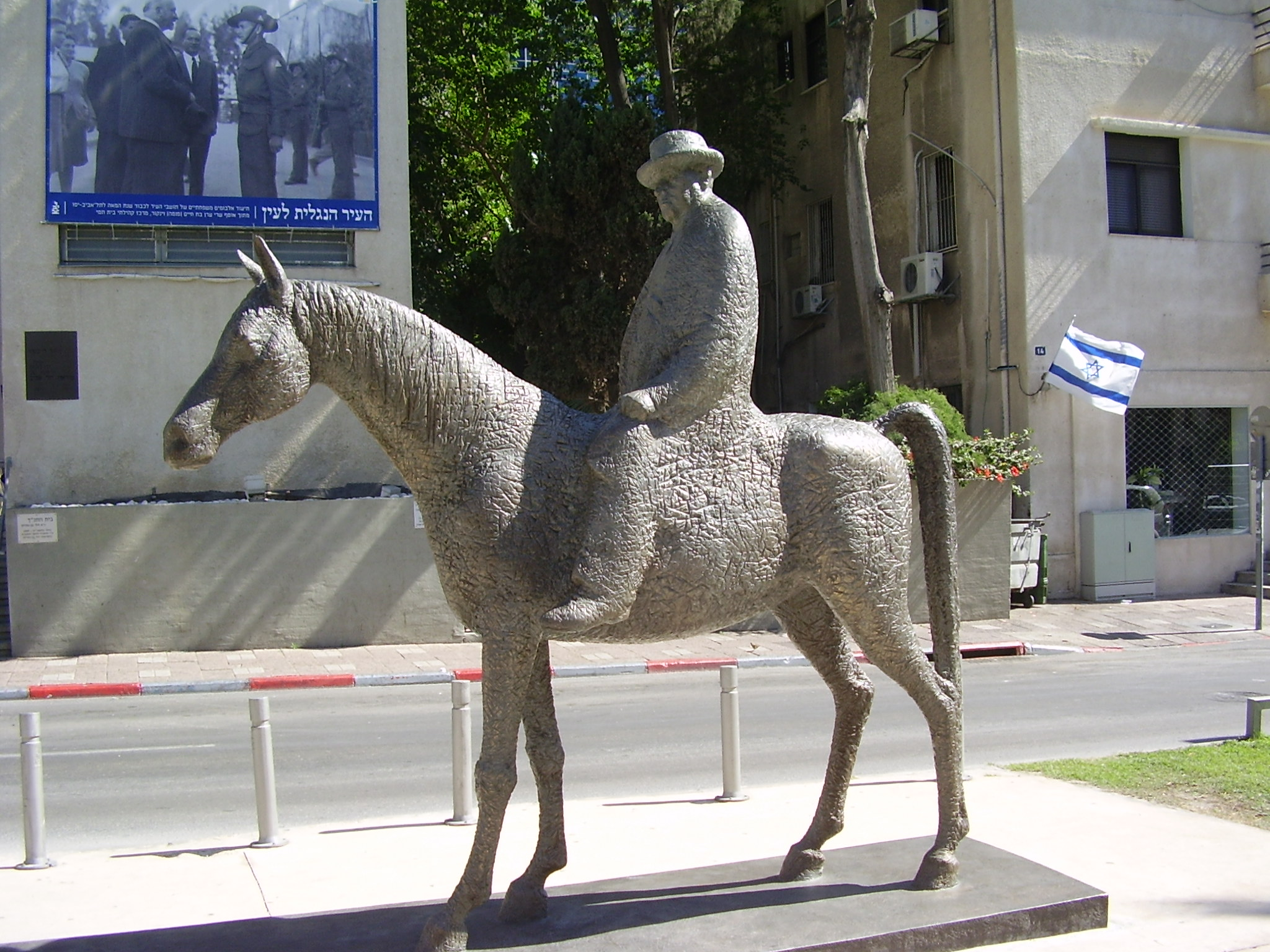
Statue of Meir Dizengoff on his horse, in Tel Aviv

== Italy ==
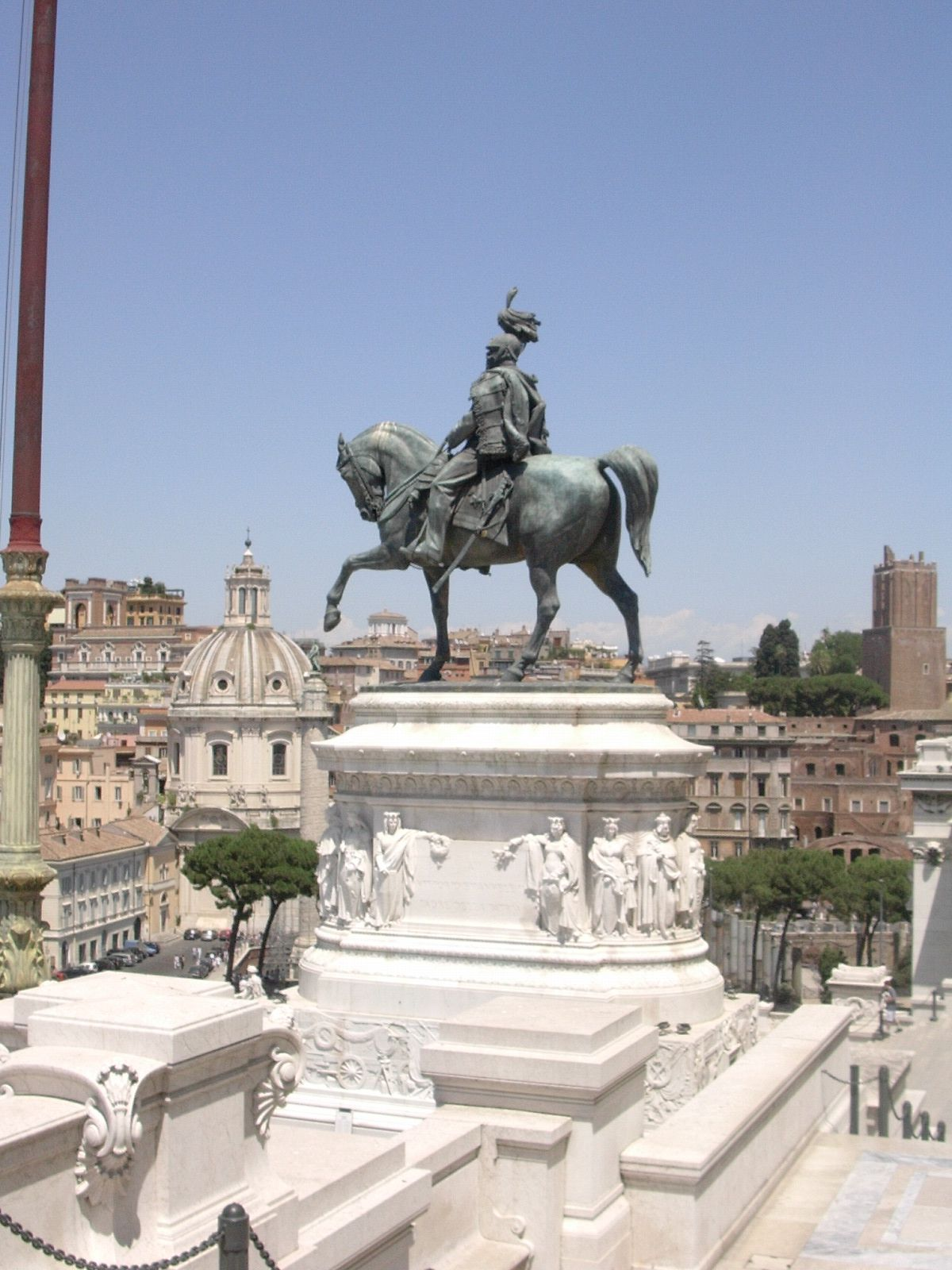
The equestrian statue of King Victor Emmanuel II, architectural centre of the Altare della Patria in Rome, whose marble base the statues of the Italian noble cities are carved

Frequently represented persons:

- Giuseppe Garibaldi (1807–1882), celebrated as one of the greatest generals of modern times and as the "Hero of the Two Worlds" because of his military enterprises in South America and Europe, who fought in many military campaigns that led to Italian unification. He was a general, revolutionary and republican. He is considered to be one of Italy's "fathers of the fatherland".
- Victor Emmanuel II (1820–1878), Italian: Vittorio Emanuele II. He was King of Sardinia (also informally known as Piedmont–Sardinia) from 23 March 1849 until 17 March 1861, when he assumed the title of King of Italy and became the first king of an independent, united Italy since the 6th century, a title he held until his death in 1878. Borrowing from the old Latin title Pater Patriae of the Roman emperors, the Italians gave him the epithet of "Father of the Fatherland" (Italian: Padre della Patria).

== Japan ==
Tokyo

- Equestrian statue of Kusunoki Masashige by Kōtarō Takamura outside the Imperial Palace, 1897.
- Equestrian statue of Prince Arisugawa Taruhito at the Arisugawa Memorial Park, 1903.
- Equestrian statue of Prince Kitashirakawa Yoshihisa n the outer gardens of the Imperial Palace, 1904.
- Equestrian statue of Prince Komatsu Akihito at the Ueno Park, 1912.
- Equestrian statue of Field marshal Ōyama Iwao in Kudanzaka, 1918.
- Equestrian statue of Nitta Yoshisada close to Bubaikawara Station in Fuchū, 1988.
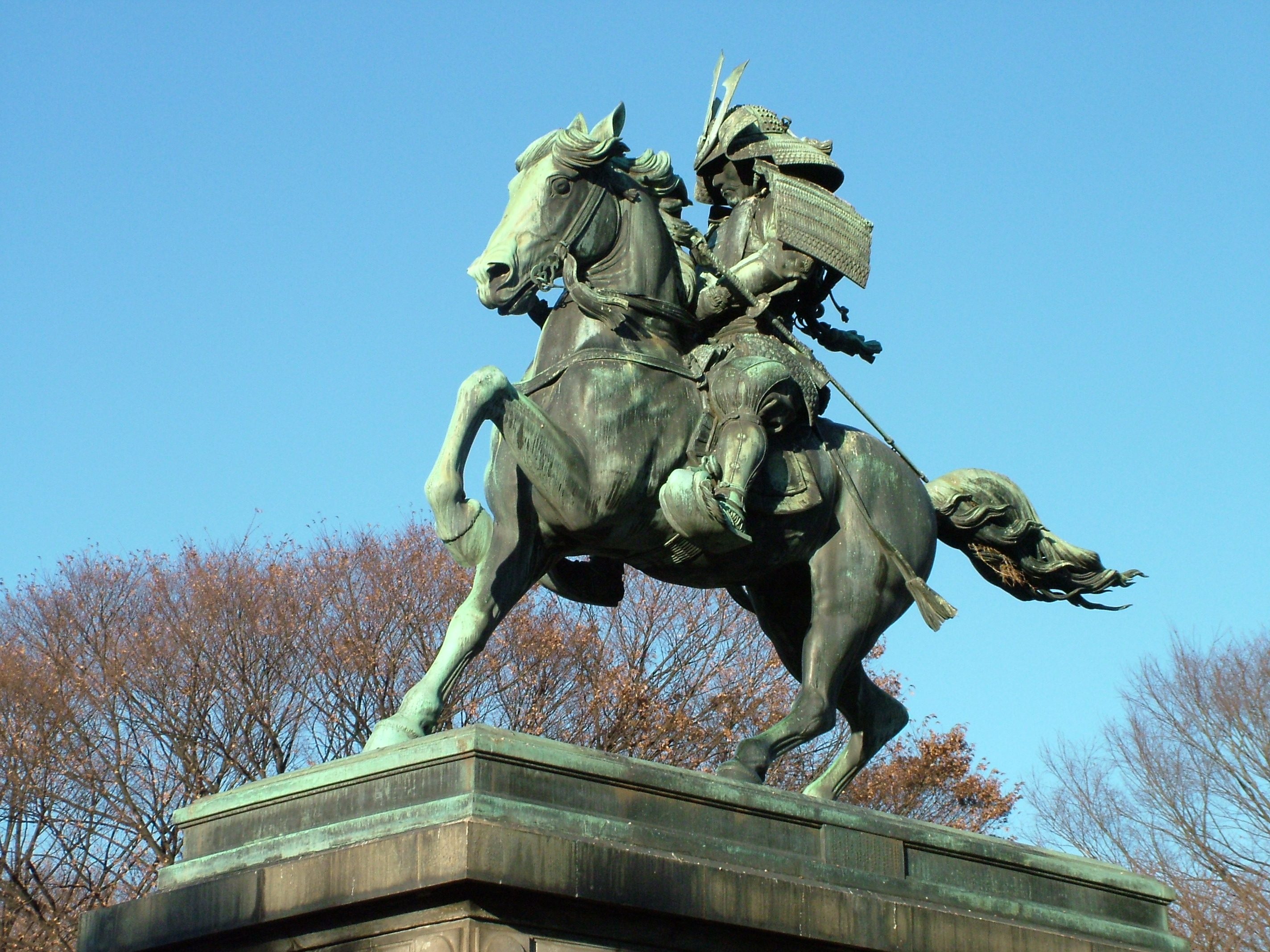
Kusunoki Masashige

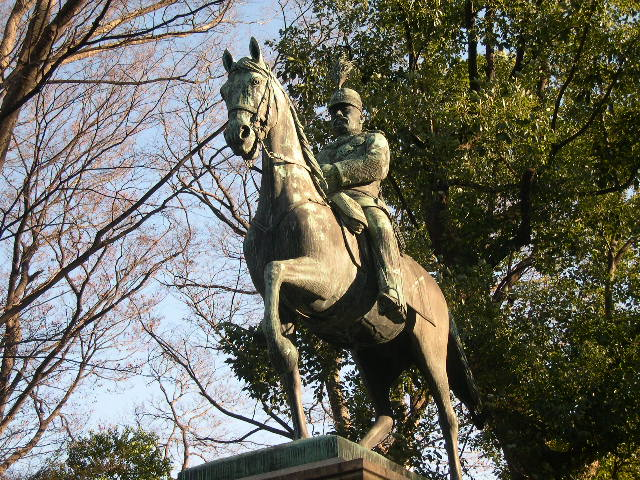
Prince Arisugawa Taruhito

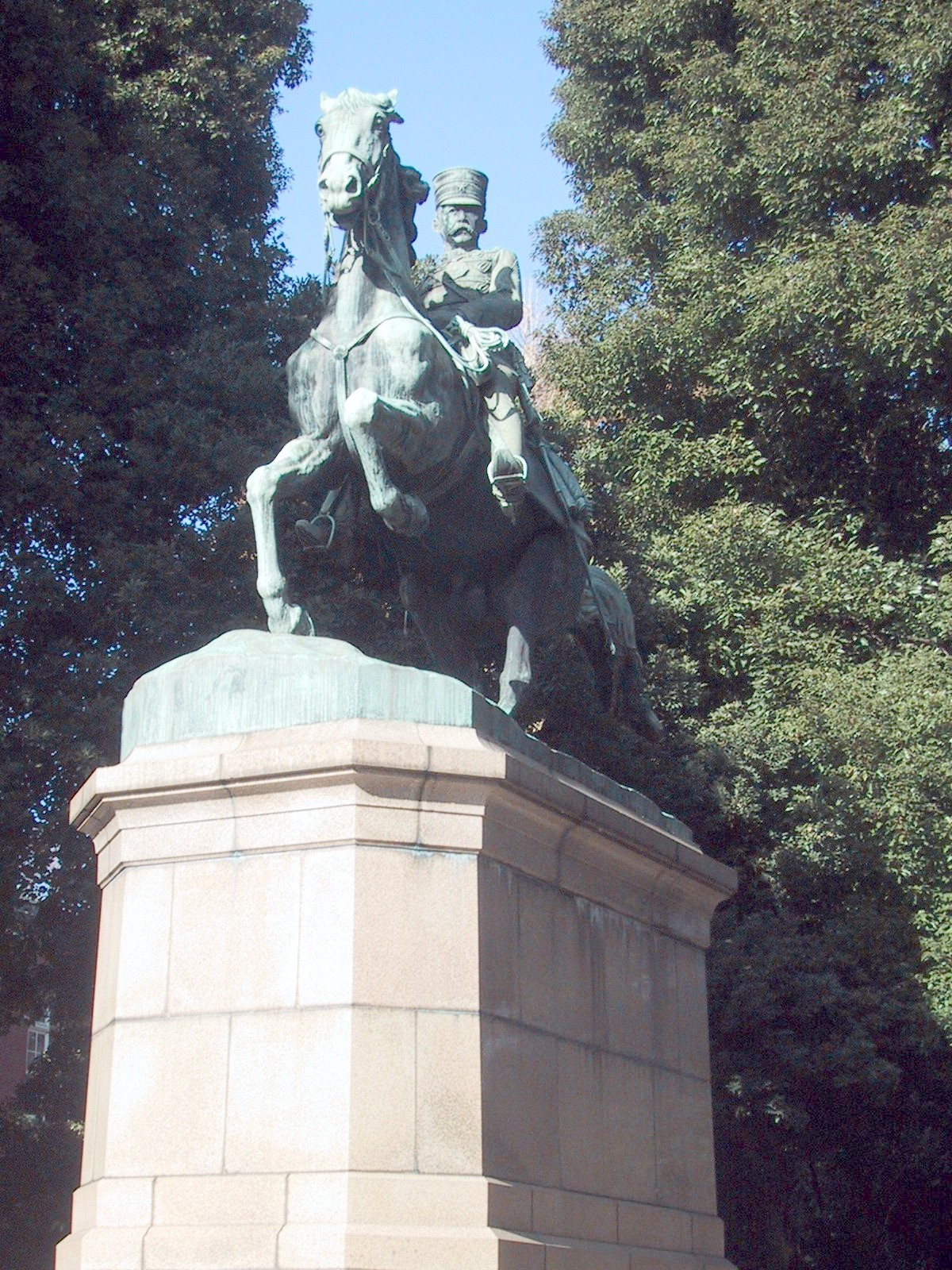
Prince Kitashirakawa Yoshihisa

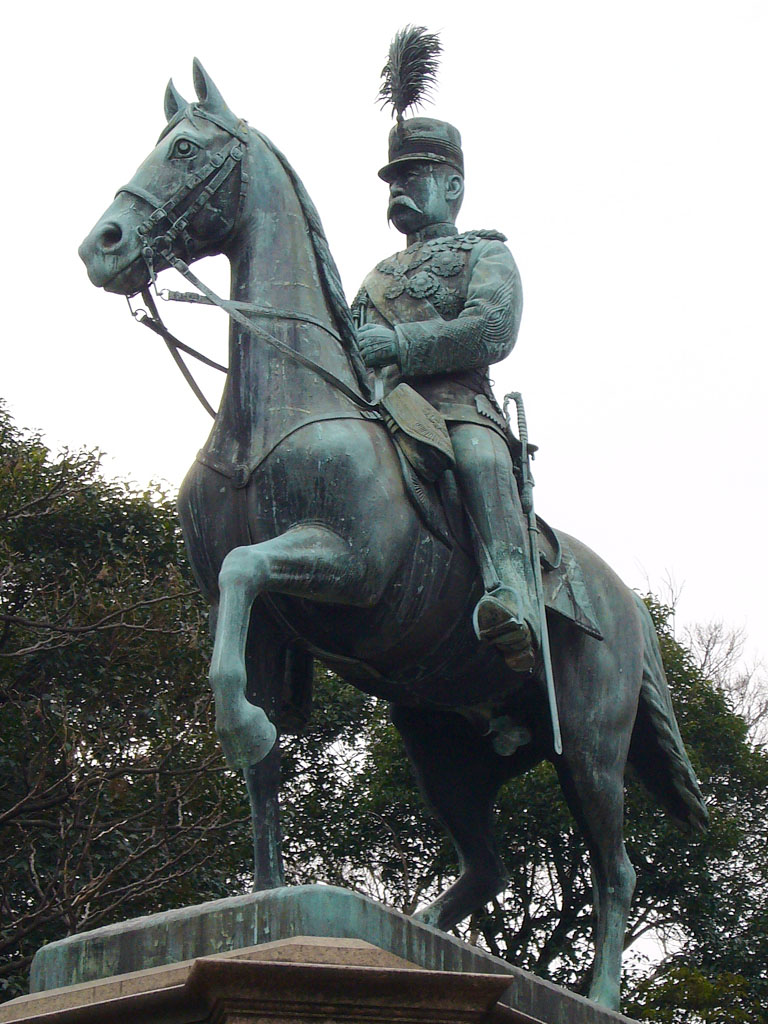
Prince Komatsu Akihito

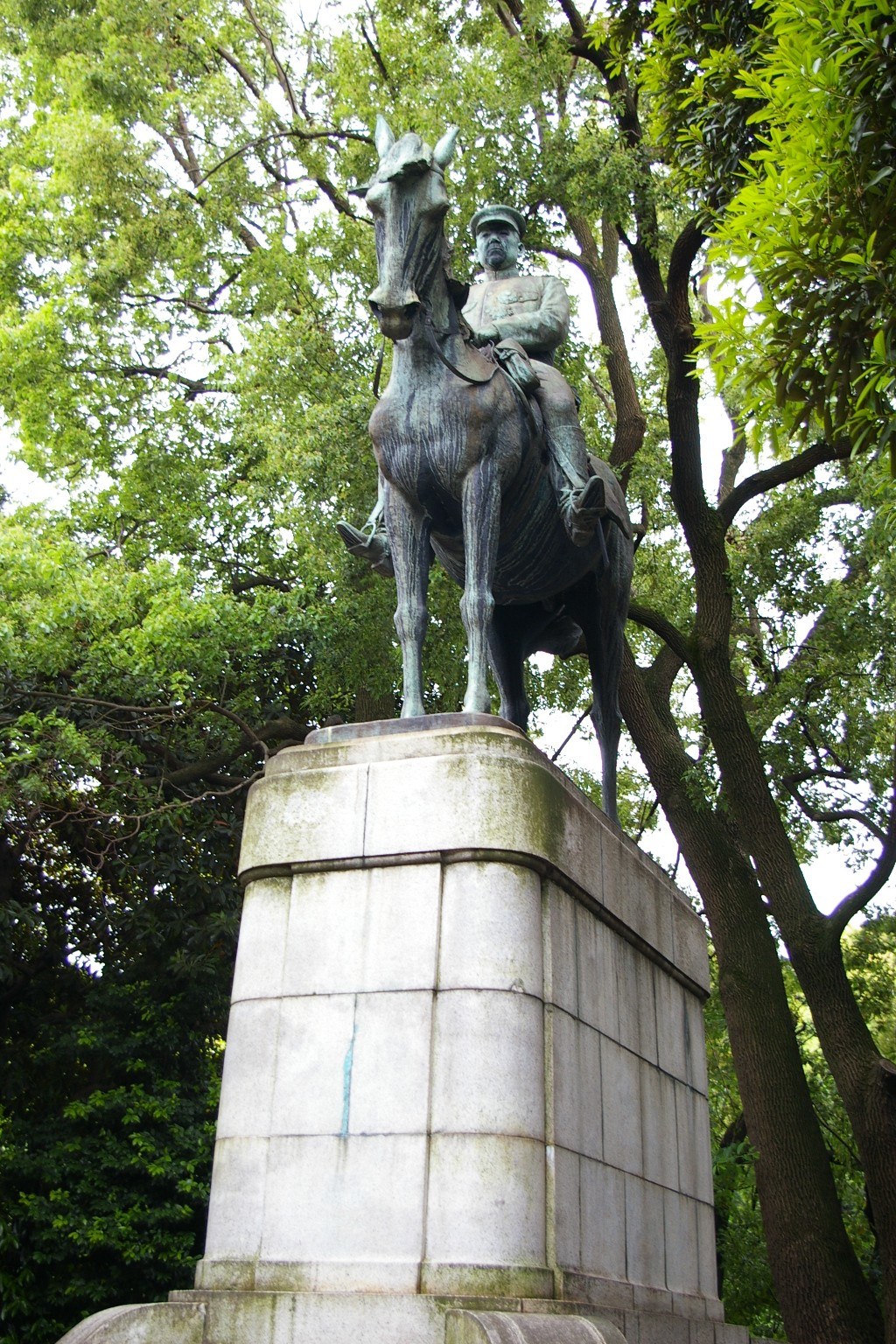
Ōyama Iwao

Kanazawa

- Equestrian statue of Maeda Toshiie close to Oyama Shrine.

Kobe

- Equestrian statue of Don Quixote at the Suma Rikyu Park.

Kōchi

- Equestrian statue of Yamauchi Kazutoyo in the Kōchi Castle.

Komatsushima

- Equestrian statue of Minamoto Yoshitsune. The tallest equestrian statue in Japan (6.7 meters high).

Kumagaya

- Equestrian statue of Kumagai Naozane close to Kumagaya Station.

Kushimoto

- Equestrian statue of Mustafa Kemal Atatürk, placed as a token of friendship between Japan and Turkey.
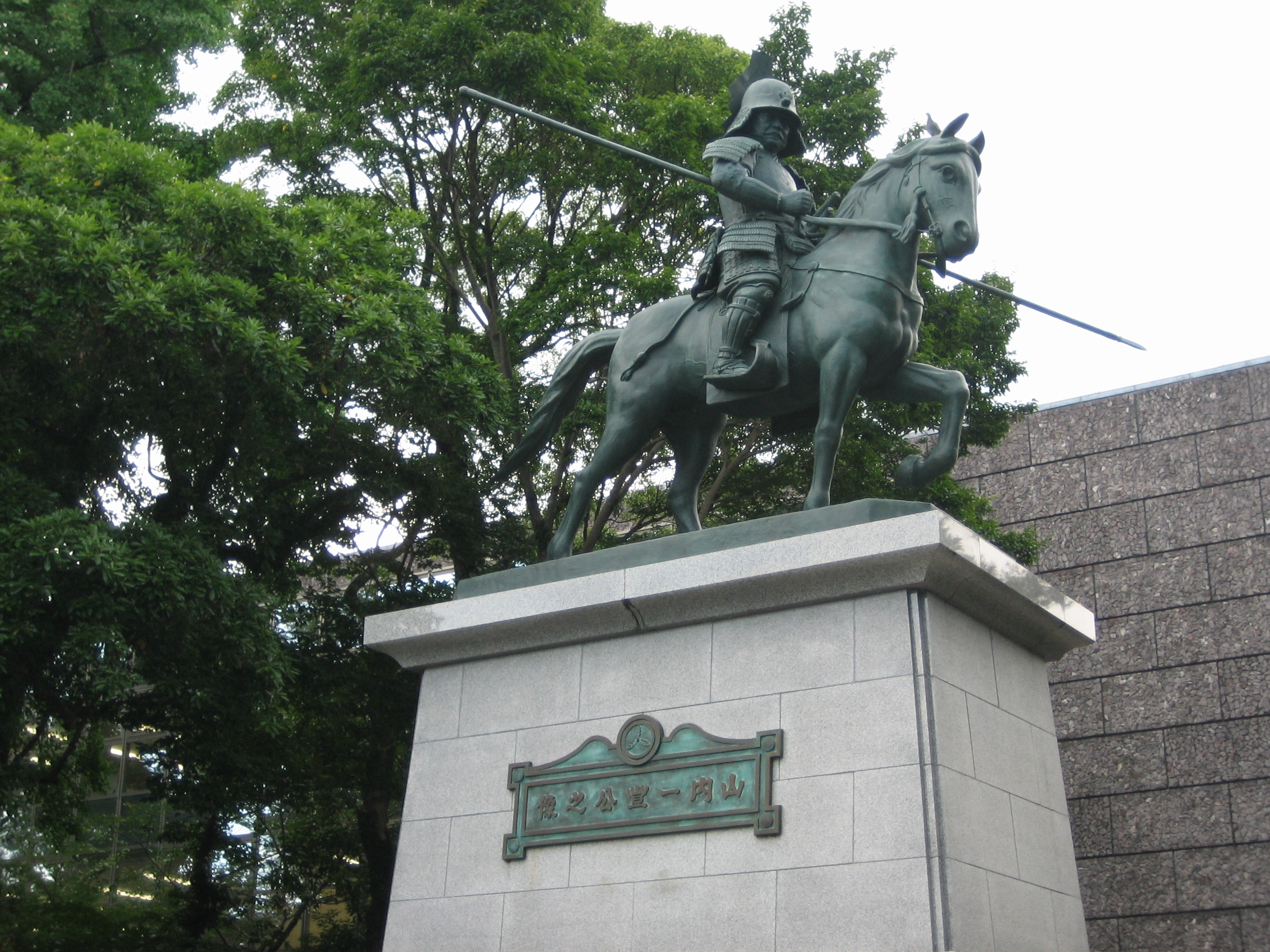
Yamauchi Kazutoyo in Kōchi

Nagano

- Takeda Shingen versus equestrian Uesugi Kenshin in Kawanakajima.

Nagoya

- Equestrian statue of Francesco Sforza in Nagoya International Conference Center, 1989
- Equestrian statue of Maeda Toshiie in Arako.

Osaka

- Equestrian statue of Kusunoki Masashige in Kanshinji temple in Kawachinagano.

Ōsaki

- Equestrian statue of Date Masamune close to Yūbikan Station.
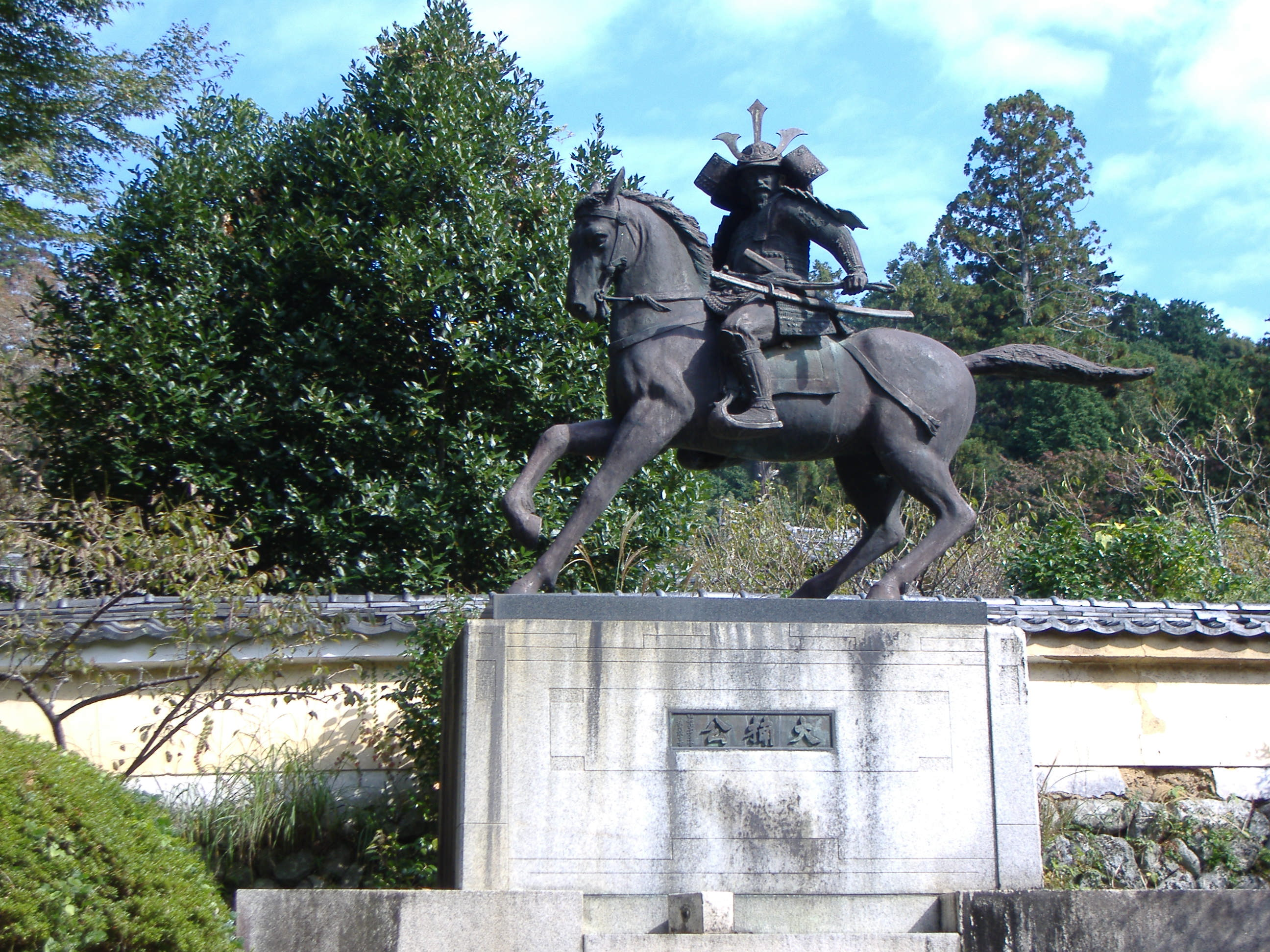
Kusunoki Masashige in Osaka

Sendai

- Equestrian statue of Date Masamune in the Aoba Castle, 1933

Ueda

- Equestrian statue of Sanada Yukimura.

Wakayama

- Equestrian statue of Tokugawa Yoshimune.
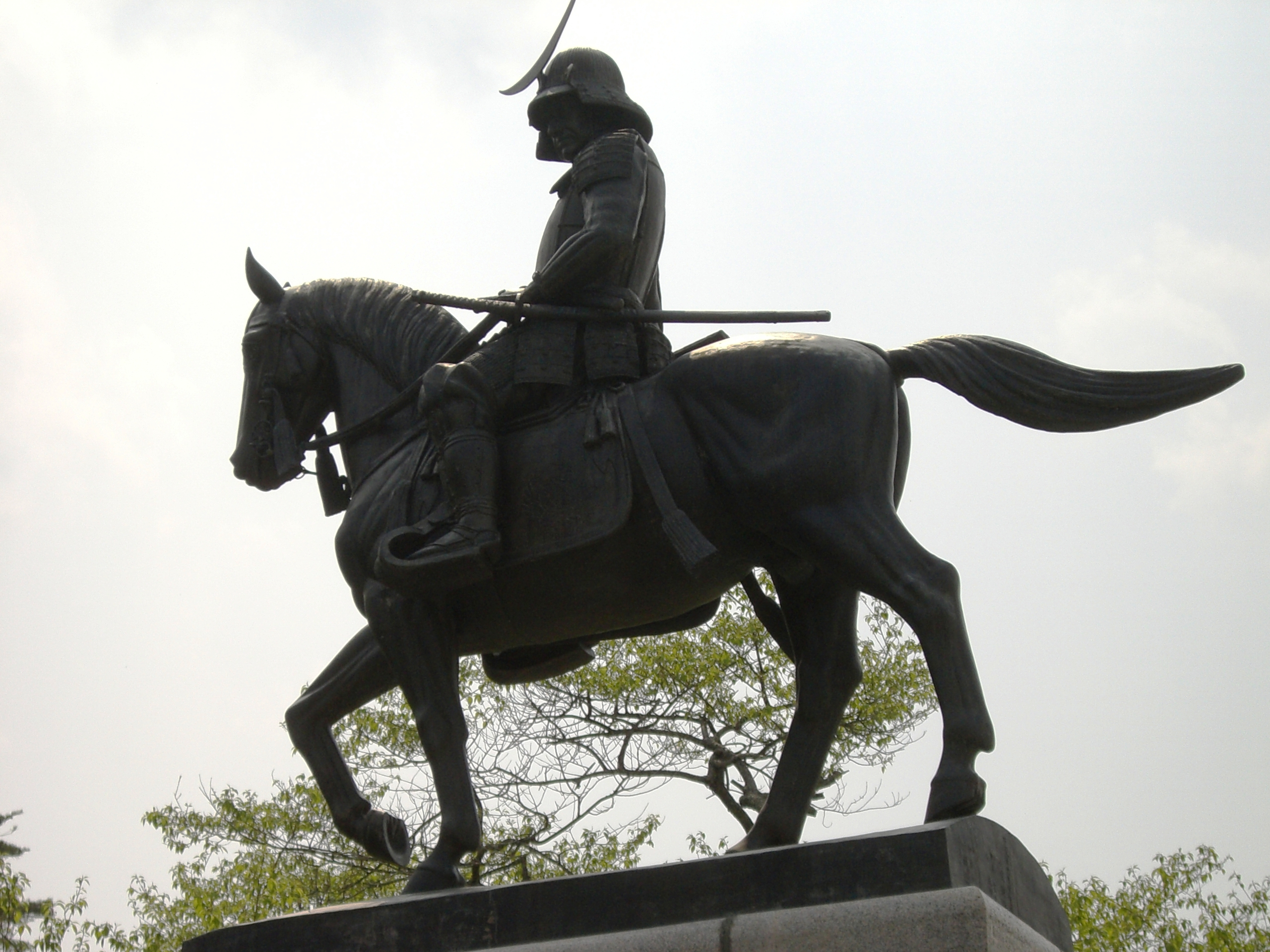
Date Masamune in Sendai

== Jordan ==
Al-Karak

- Equestrian statue of Sultan of Egypt and Syria Saladin.

== Kazakhstan ==
Aktobe

- Equestrian statue of Abul Khair Khan.

Korday

- Equestrian statue of Utegen-Baghatur in front of The Palace of Culture.

Nur-Sultan

- Equestrian statue of Kazakh Khan Kenesary Kasymov.
- Equestrian statue of Baghatur Bogenbay.

Oral

- Equestrian statue of Vasily Chapayev across from the train station, 1980s.
- Monument of Misha Gavrilov, young Red Army soldier during the Russian Civil War. The injured horse lies under the rider.

Taraz

- Equestrian statue of Baydibek Karsha-Uly (sculptured by D.Aldekov and N.Rustemov) at the city central square, 2002.
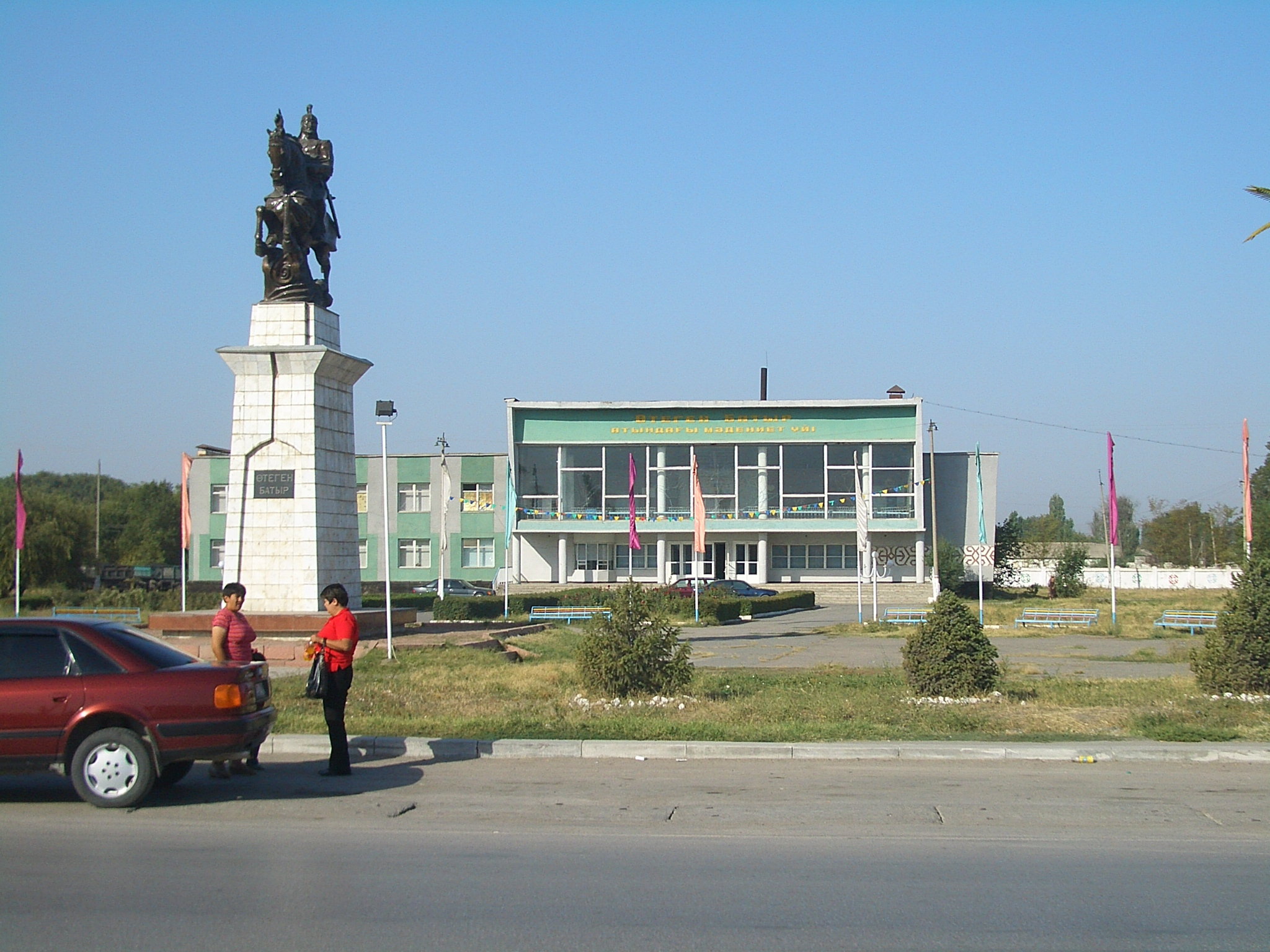
Utegen-Baghatur in Korday

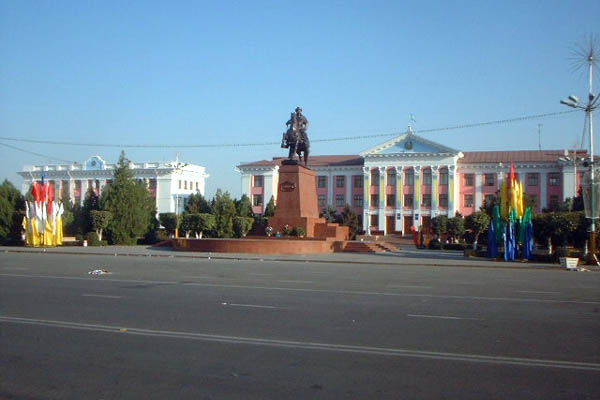
Baydibek-Baba in Taraz

== Kosovo ==
Pristina

- Equestrian of Skanderbeg.
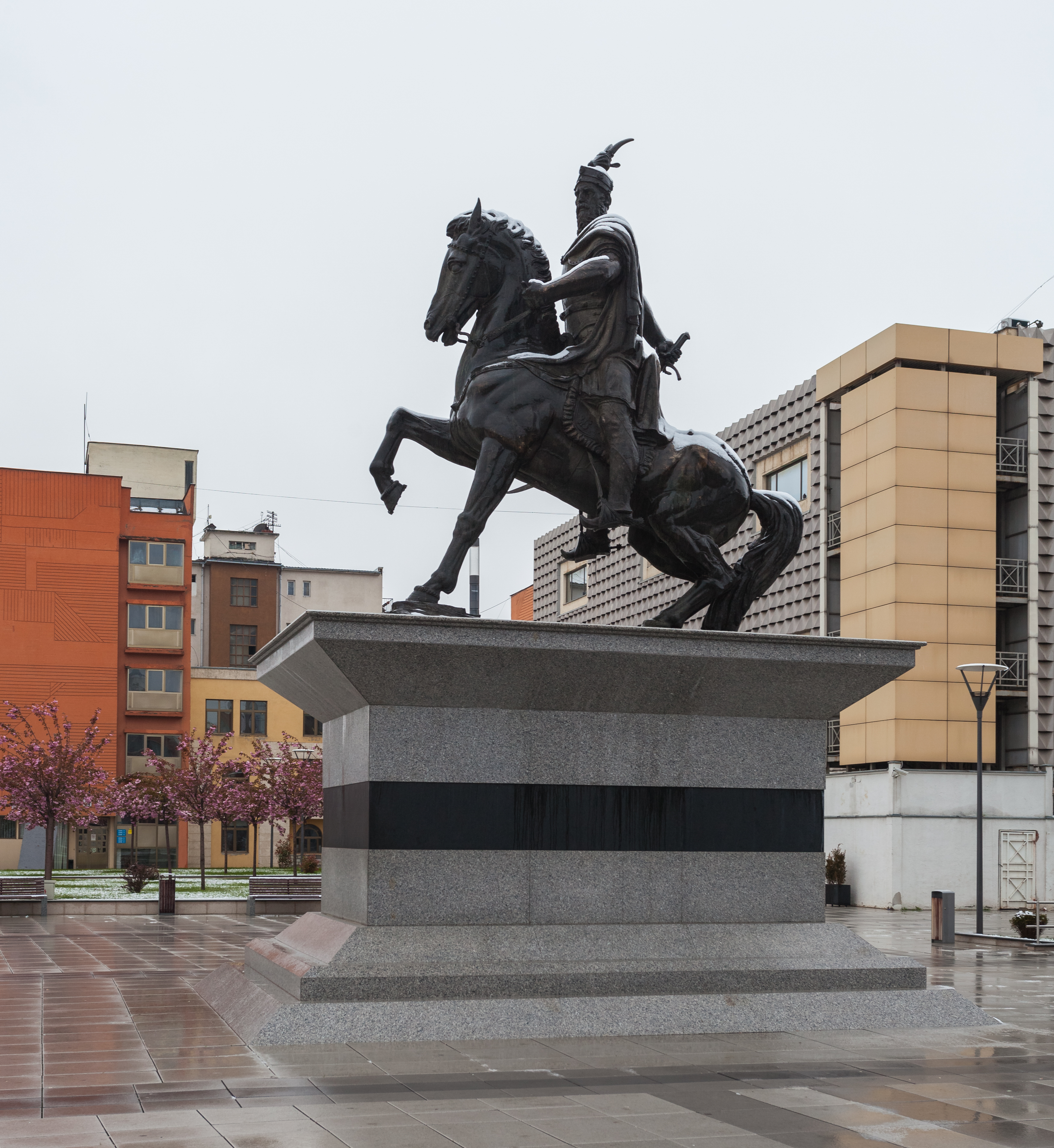
Skanderbeg in Pristina

== Kyrgyzstan ==
Bishkek

- Equestrian statue of Mikhail Frunze at a large park (Boulevard Erkindik) across from the train station. Foto
- Equestrian statue of Manas in front of Philharmonic.

== Latvia ==
Riga

- Equestrian monument of Peter the Great, at Brīvības gatves, by German sculptor Schmidt-Kossel, erected in 1910. The statue was evacuated and lost during WW1, but was later returned to Riga.
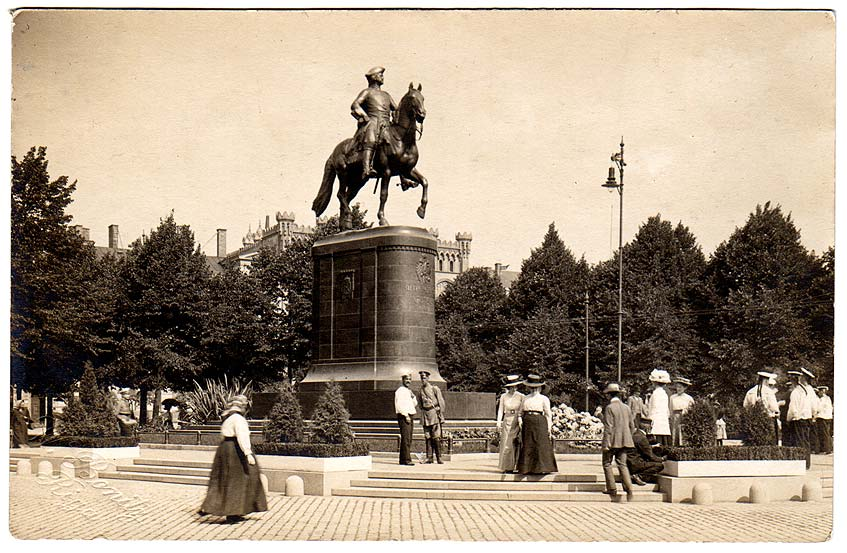
Peter the Great, Riga

== Lithuania ==
Vilnius

- Equestrian monument of Gediminas, in the Lower Castle, by Vytautas Kašuba, 1996.
- Equestrian statue Gražina in the Great courtyard of the Seimas Palace, by Dalia Matulaitė
- Equestrian statue of Saint George defeating the dragon in Gediminas Avenue, by Kęstute Balčiūnas, 2005 (replacing an earlier statue destroyed by the Nazis in 1944).
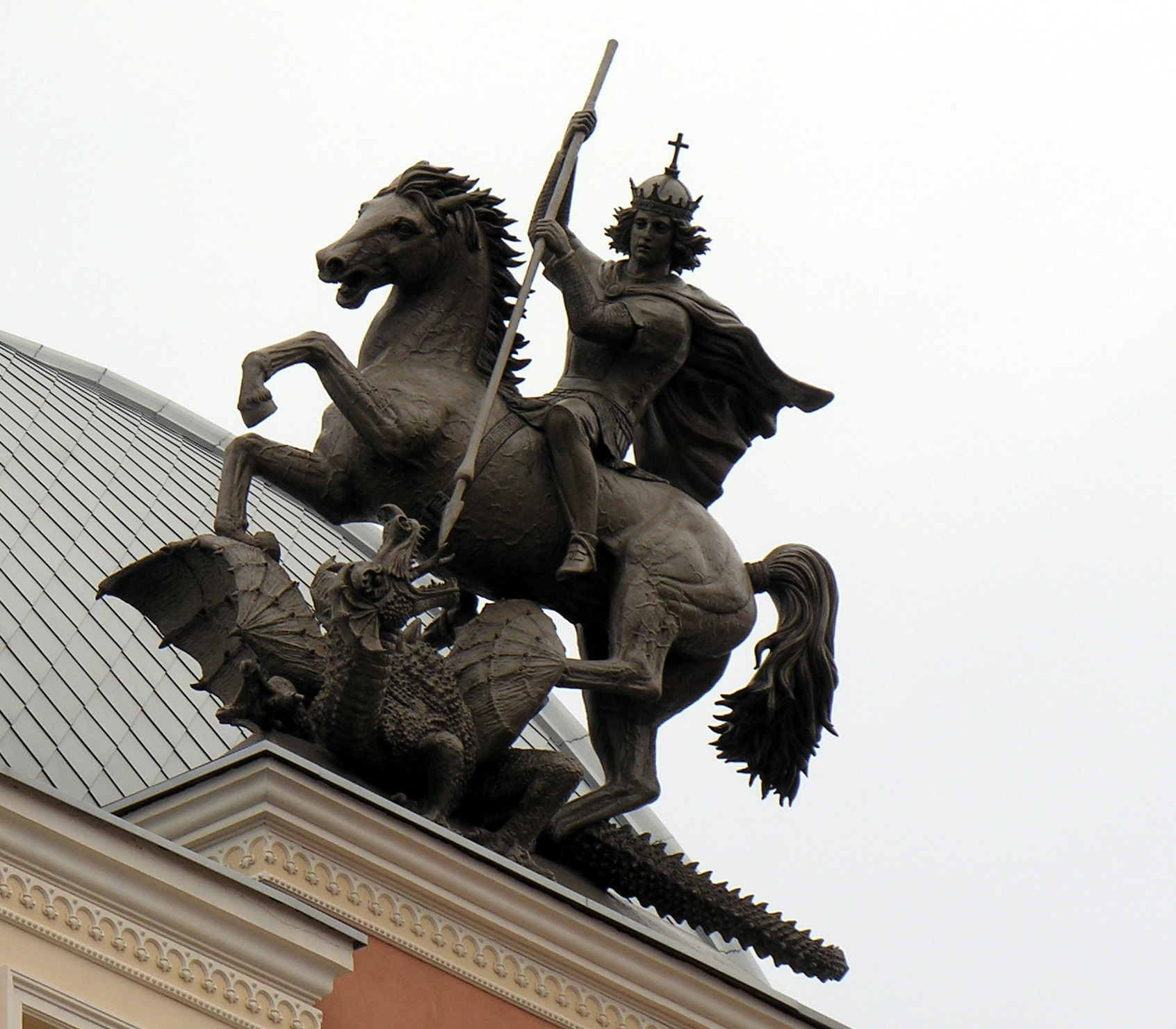
Saint George in Vilnius

Birštonas

- Monument to Vytautas the Great, by G. Jokūbonis and V. Čekanauskas, 1998.
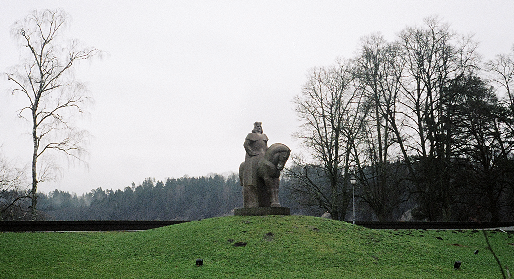
Vytautas the Great in Birštonas

== Luxembourg ==
Luxembourg

- Equestrian of Grand Duke Willem II by Antonin Mercié at the Place de Guillaune.
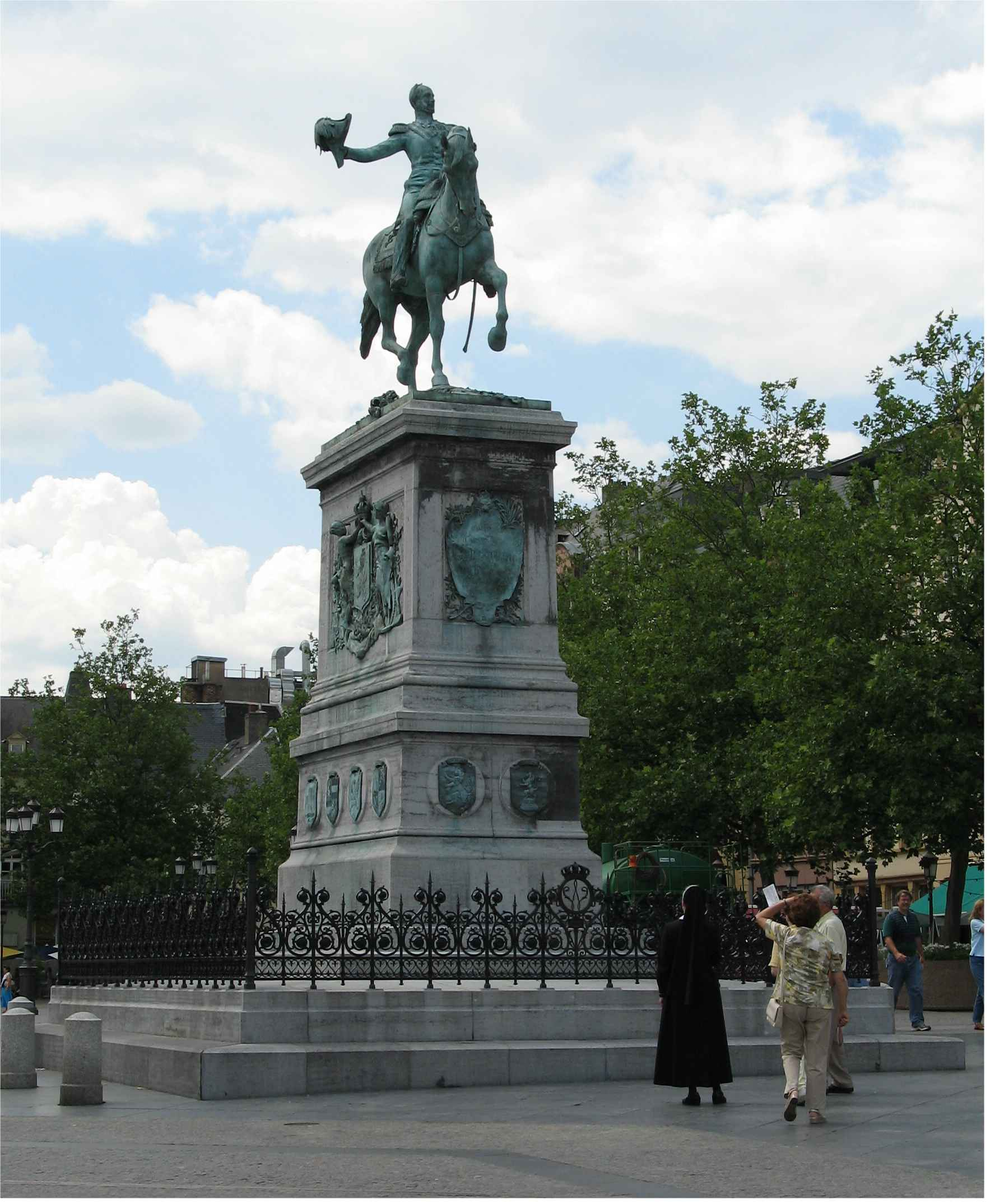
Grand Duke Willem II in Luxembourg City

== North Macedonia ==
Skopje

- Equestrian "Warrior on a horse" Greek kingdom of Macedonia (Alexander the Great)
- Equestrian of Macedonian revolutionary Goce Delčev
- Equestrian of Macedonian revolutionary Dame Gruev
- Equestrian of Skanderbeg.
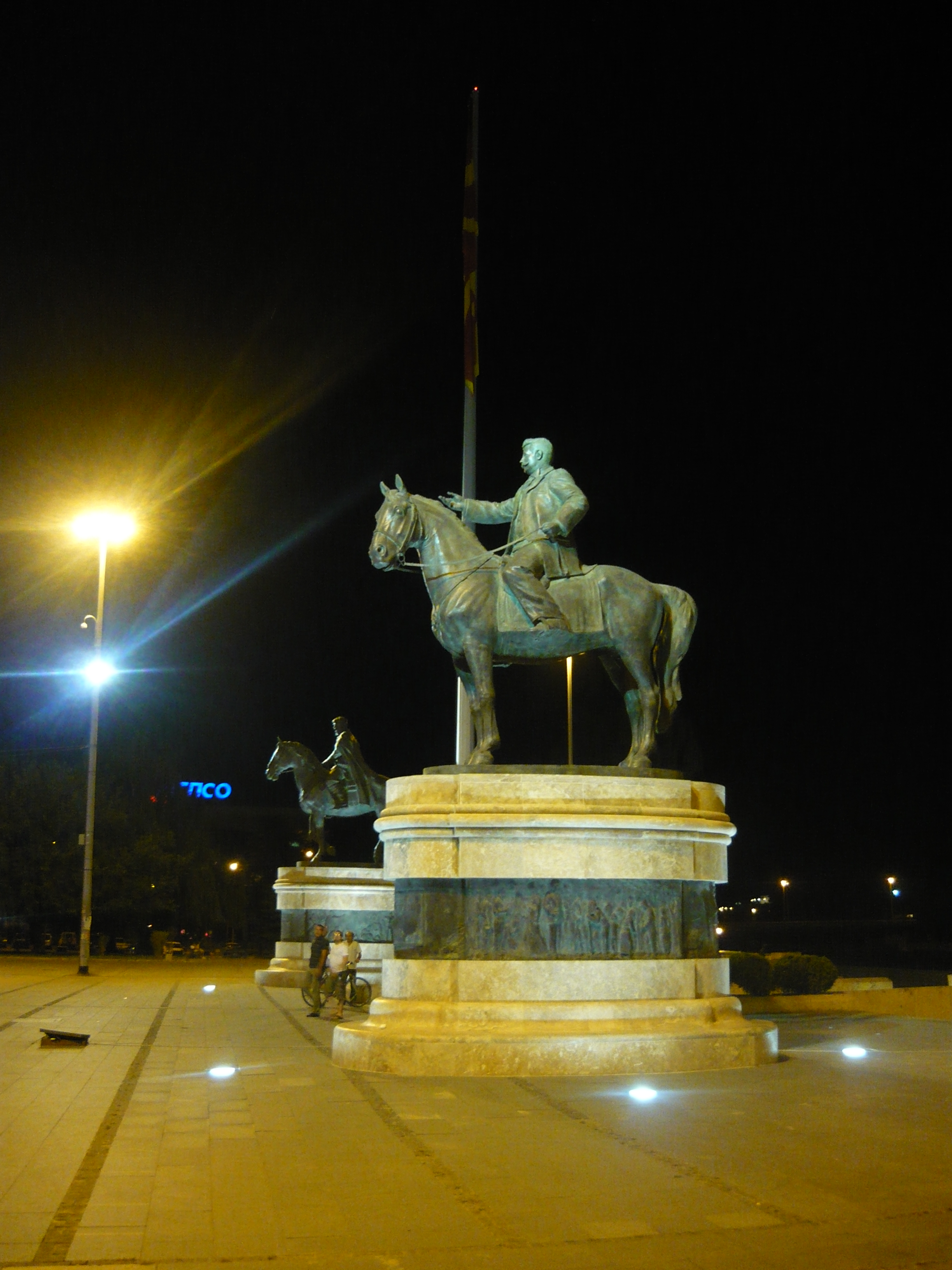
Monuments of Goce Delčev and Dame Gruev on Macedonia Square in Skopje

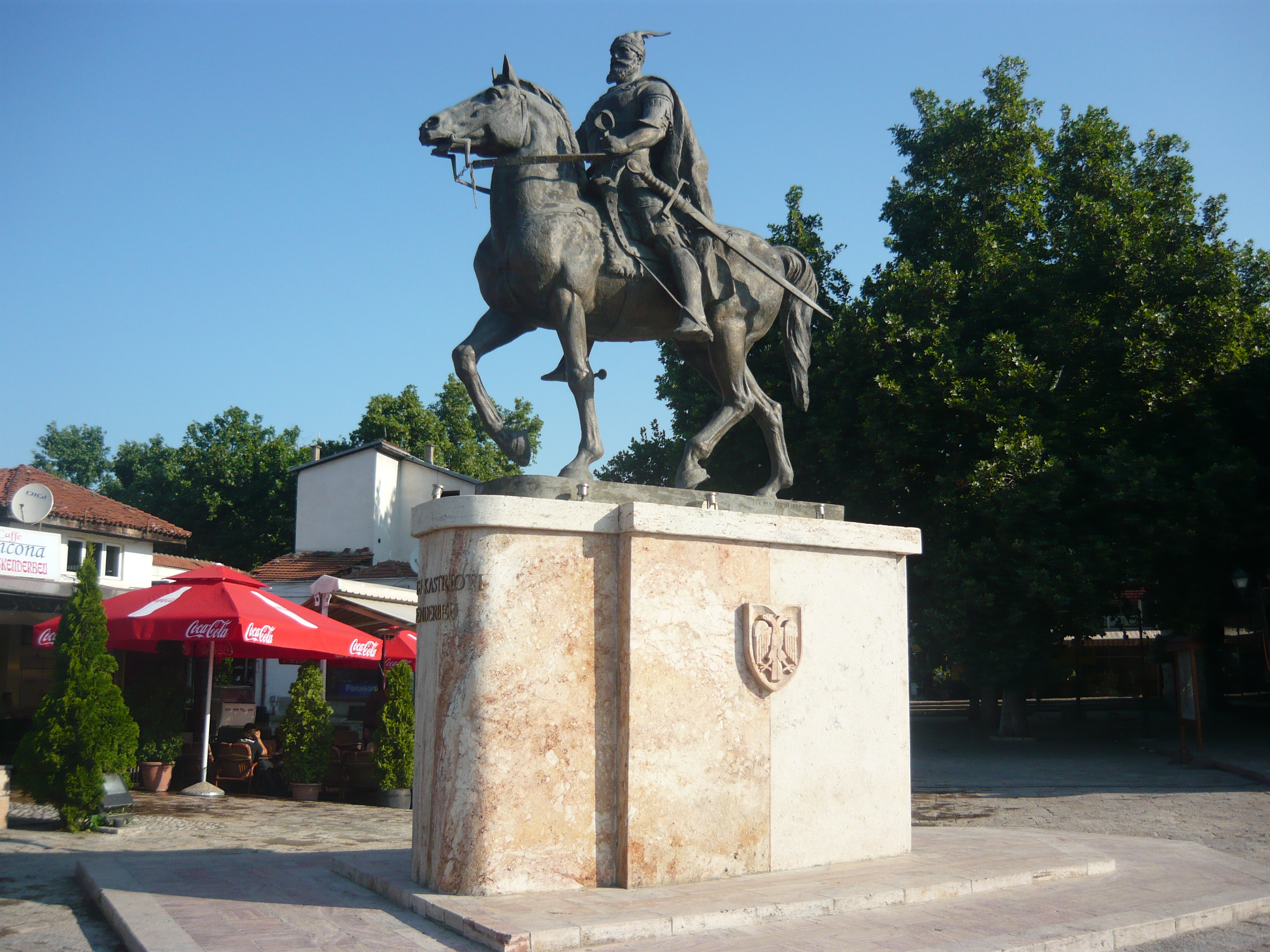
Skanderbeg monument in Skopje

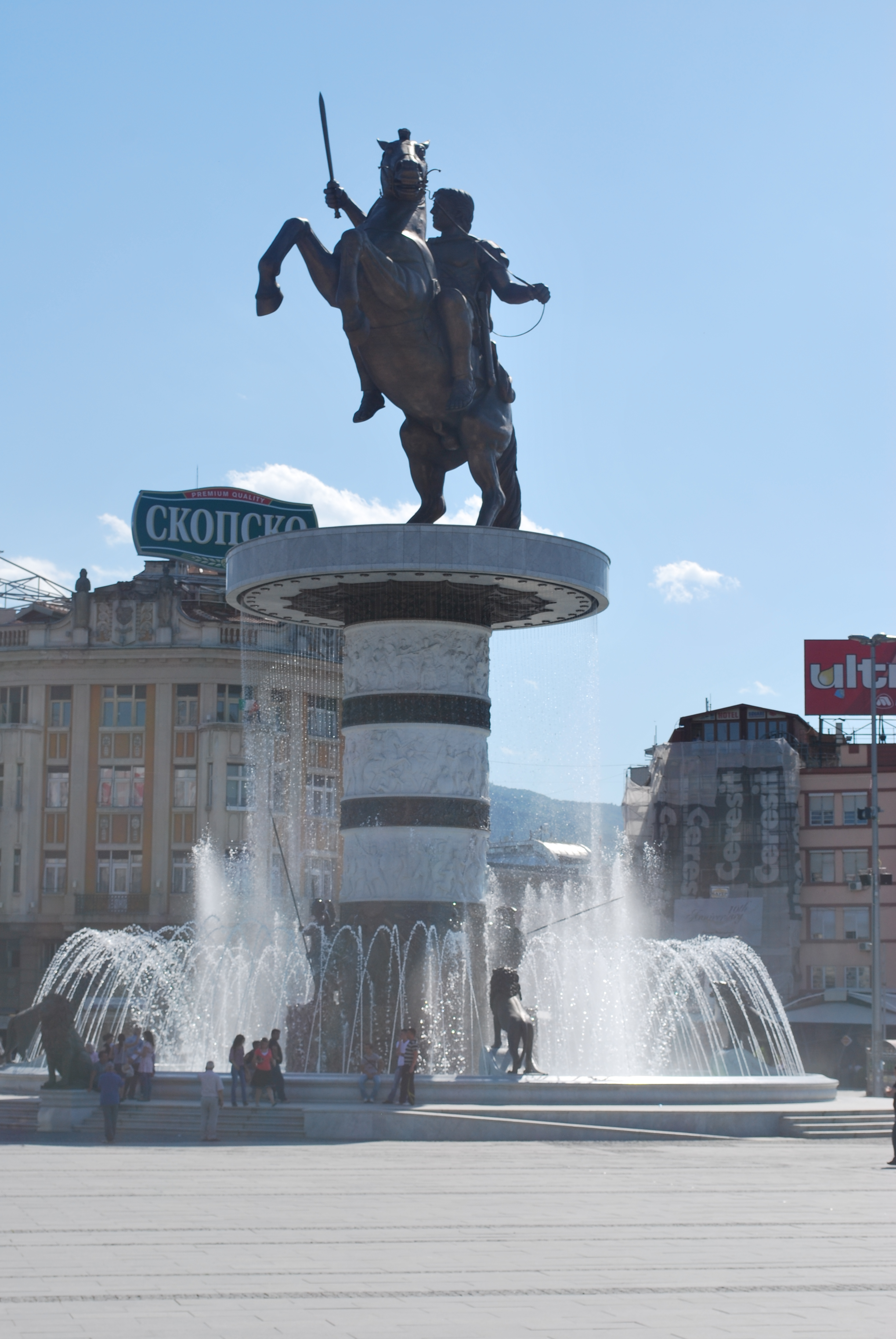
Warrior on a horse monument and fountain in Skopje

Bitola

- Equestrian of Philip II of Macedon
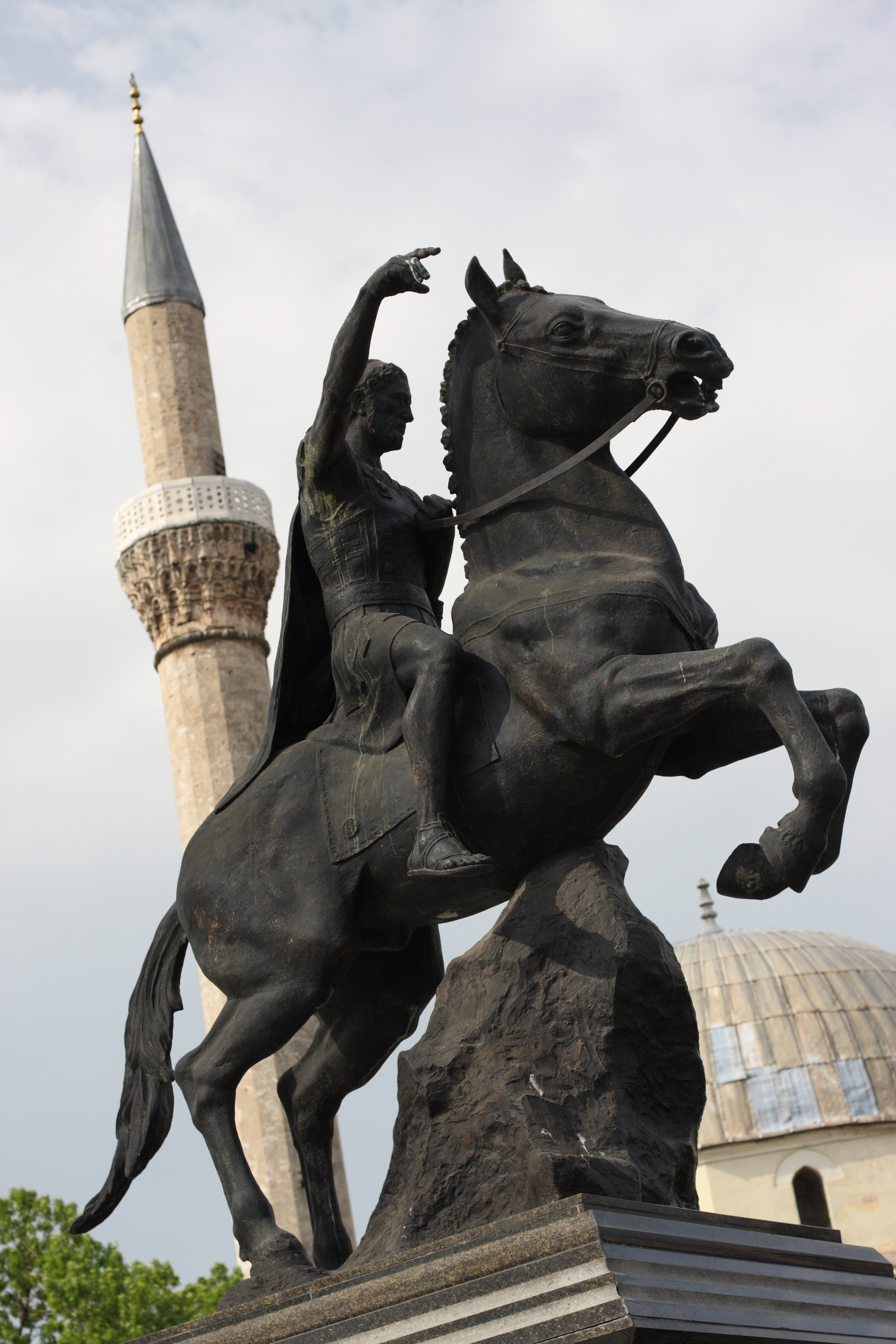
Monument of Philip II of Macedon in Bitola

== Mexico ==
Mexico City

- Equestrian statue of Charles IV of Spain, in the downtown, by Tolsá.
- Equestrian statue of José de San Martín (sculptor unknown) donated by the government of Argentina to Mexico and on display at the intersection of Paseo de la Reforma and Eje 1 Norte near Metro Garibaldi.

Chihuahua

- Equestrian statue of Pancho Villa.

Chinameca

- Equestrian statue of Emiliano Zapata at the Hacienda de Chinameca, Morelos state, site of Zapata's death.

Zacatecas

- Equestrian statue of Pancho Villa at the summit of the Cerro de la Bufa overlooking the city.
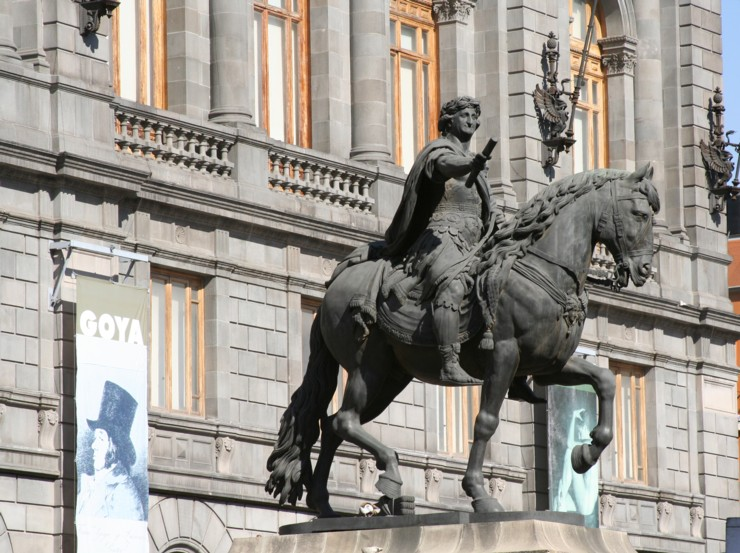
Charles IV, Mexico City

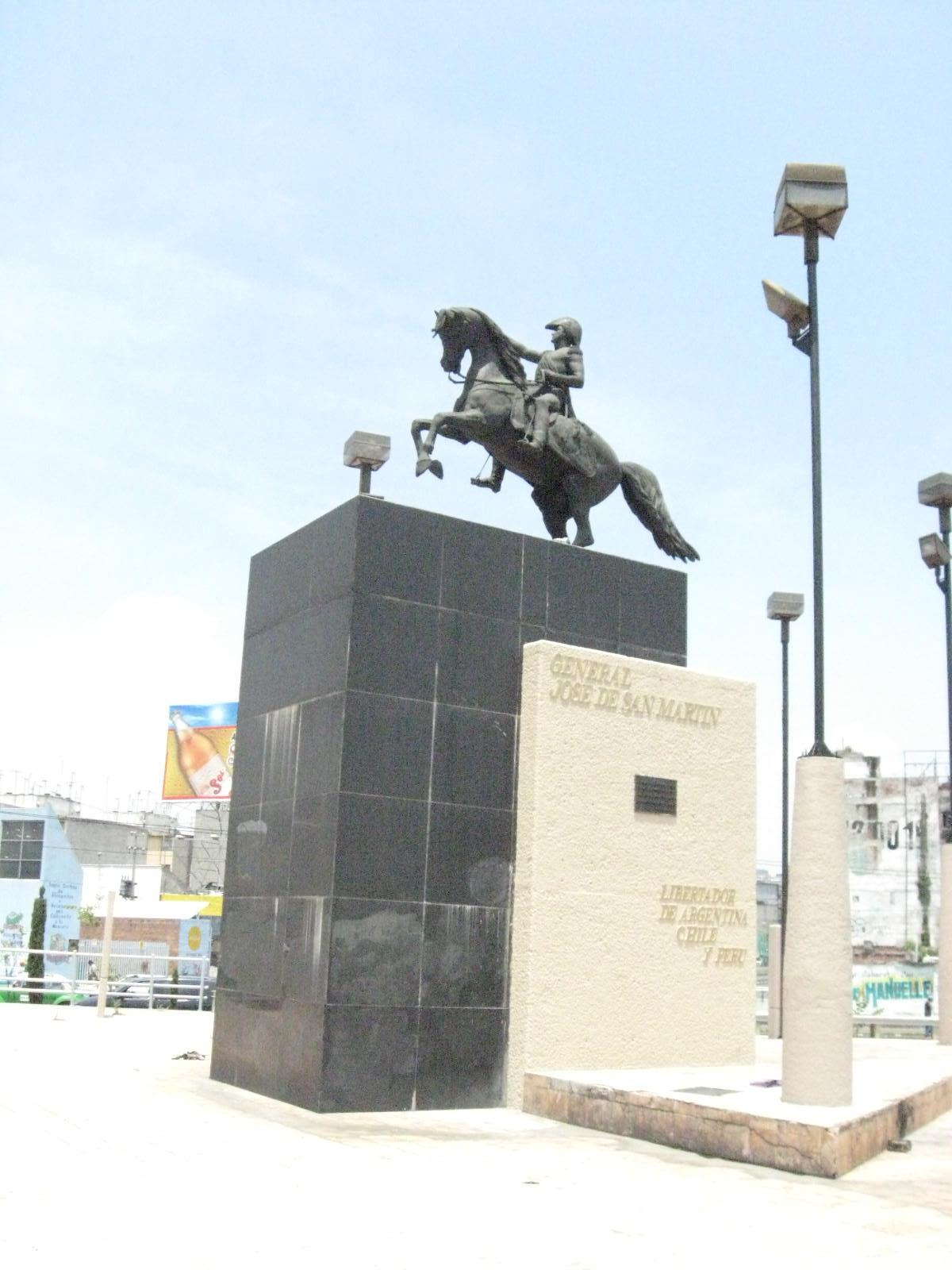
José de San Martín in Mexico City

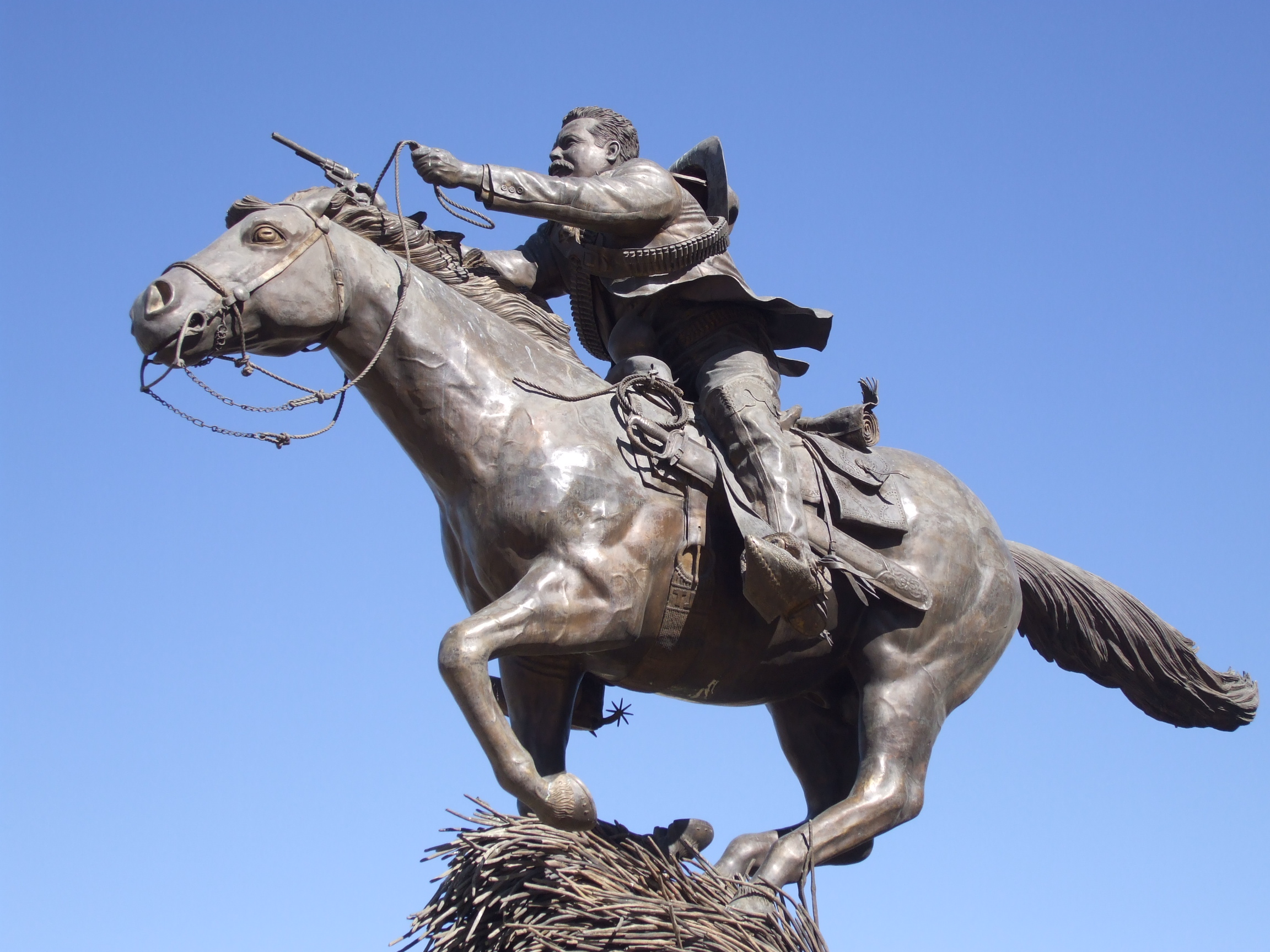
Pancho Villa in Chihuahua

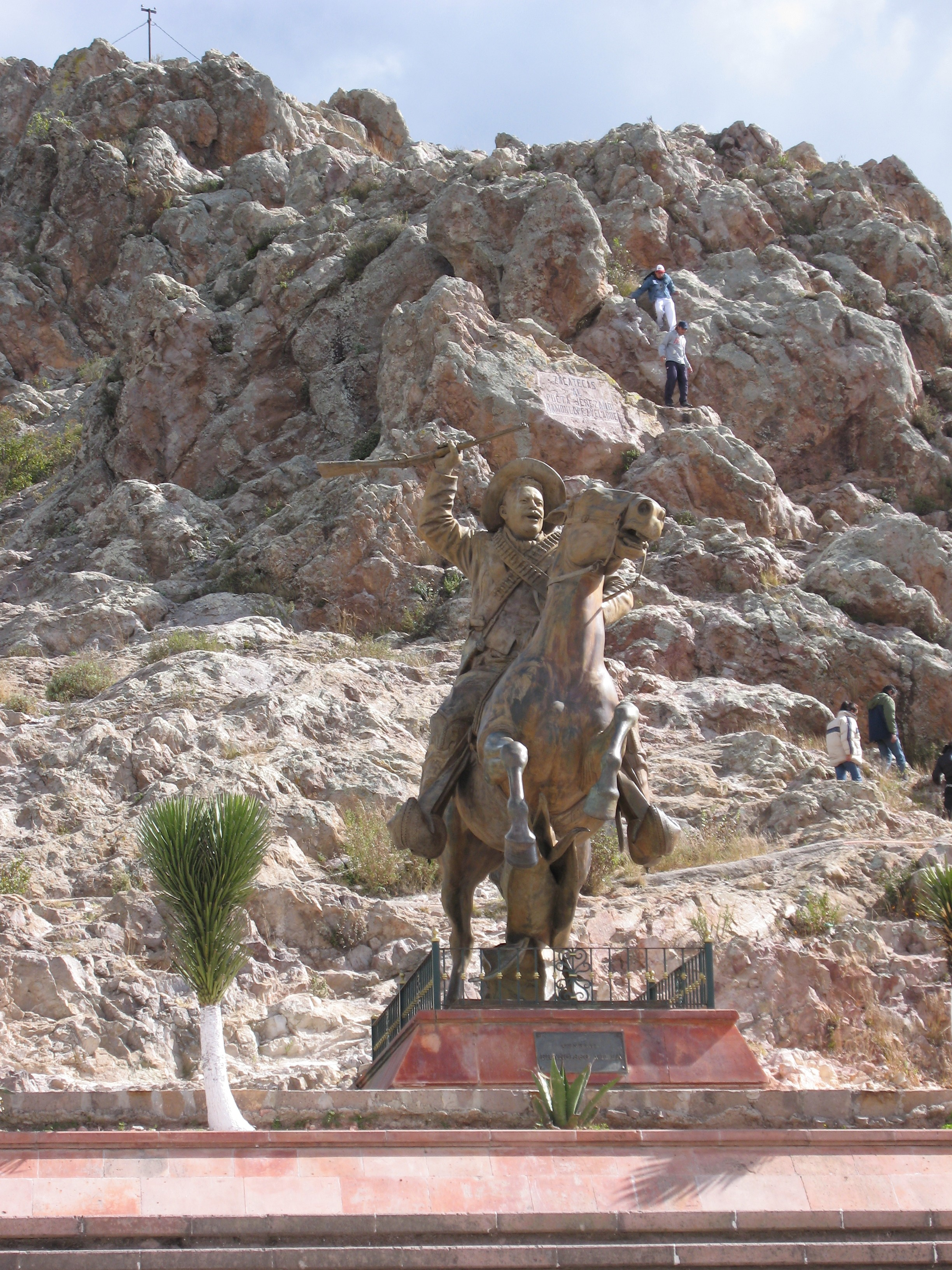
Pancho Villa in Zacatecas

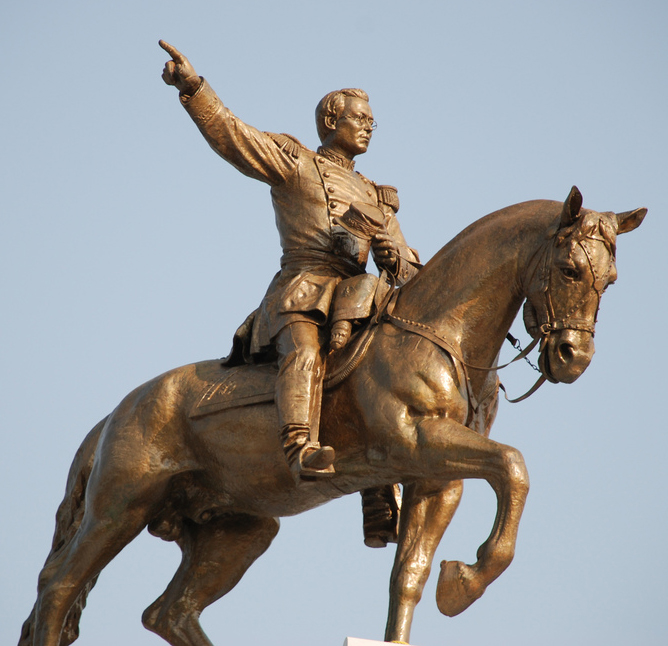
Ignacio Zaragoza (by Jesús Fructuoso Contreras)

== Moldova ==
Chişinău

- Equestrian monument of Grigore Kotovski by Lazar Dubinovsky at the Kotovski square, 1954.

Tiraspol

- Equestrian monument of Alexander Suvorov by Valentin and Victor Artamonovs at the Suvorov square, 1979.
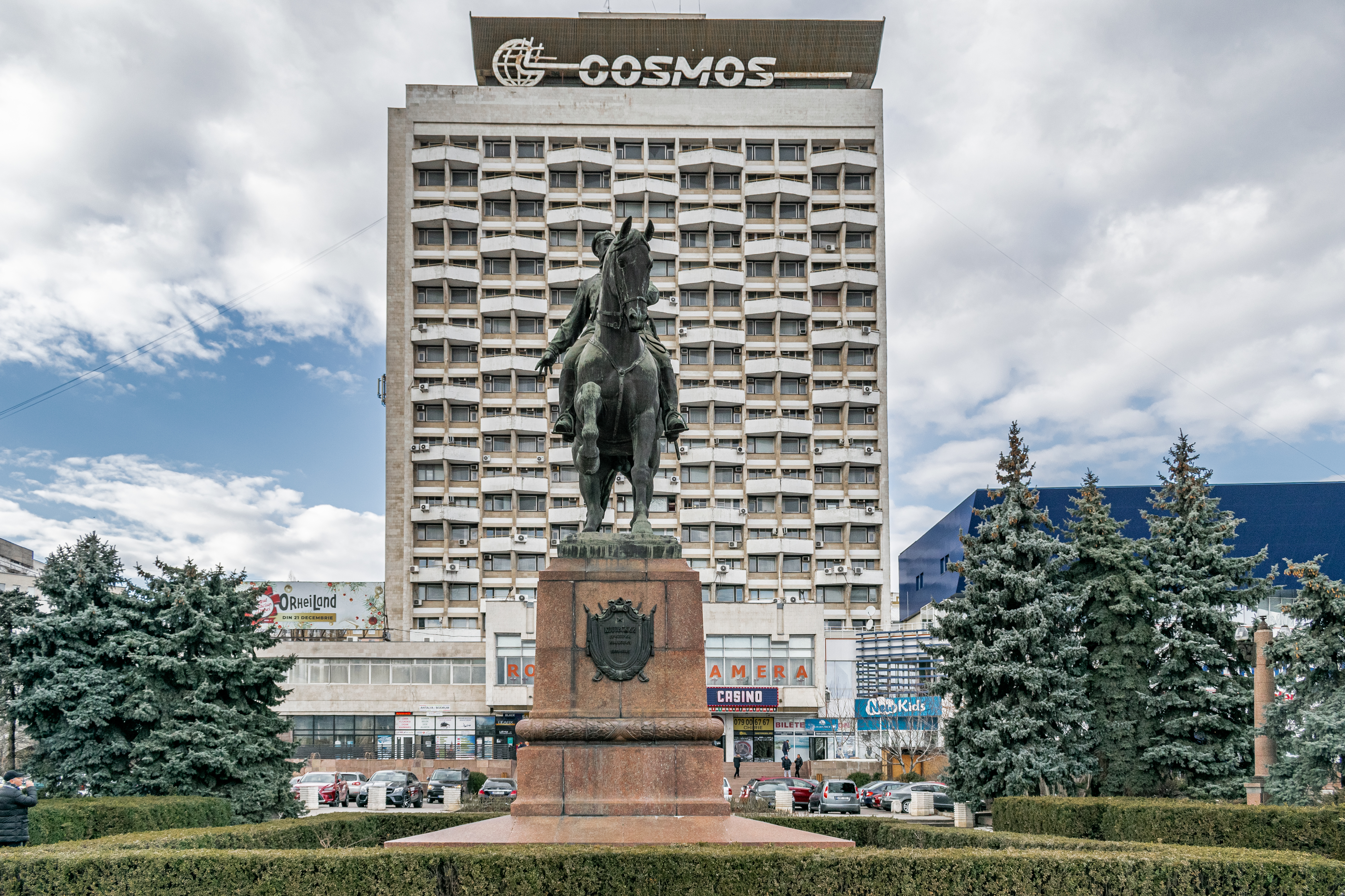
Grigore Kotovski, Chişinău

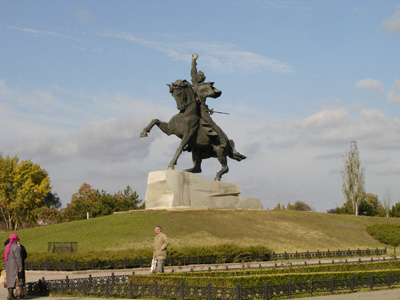
Alexander Suvorov, Tiraspol

== Mongolia ==
Ulaanbaatar

- Equestrian monument of Damdin Sükhbaatar at Sükhbaatar Square by Sonomyn Choimbol, 1946.
- Equestrian statue of Genghis Khan.
- Equestrian statue of Genghis Khan in Buyant-Ukhaa International Airport.
- Two equestrian statues of Genghis Khan's Generals in front of modern State Great Khural building.

Tov aimag

- Genghis Khan Equestrian Statue, the largest (40 metres tall) in the world, near Ulaanbaatar. The monument has a viewing platform. The sculptor was Erdembileghijn, and it was erected in 2008.

Khovd

- Equestrian statue of Amursanaa.

== Morocco ==
Casablanca

- Equestrian statue of Hubert Lyautey, 1938, now on the grounds of the French consulate.
- Equestrian statue of Tariq ibn Ziyad in M'Diq

== Namibia ==
Windhoek

- Windhoek's Reiterdenkmal is an equestrian monument to the victory of the Germans in the Herero and Namaqua War 1904–1907. Originally situated in front of the Christuskirche, since 2009 in front of Alte Feste. Inaugurated on 27 January 1912.
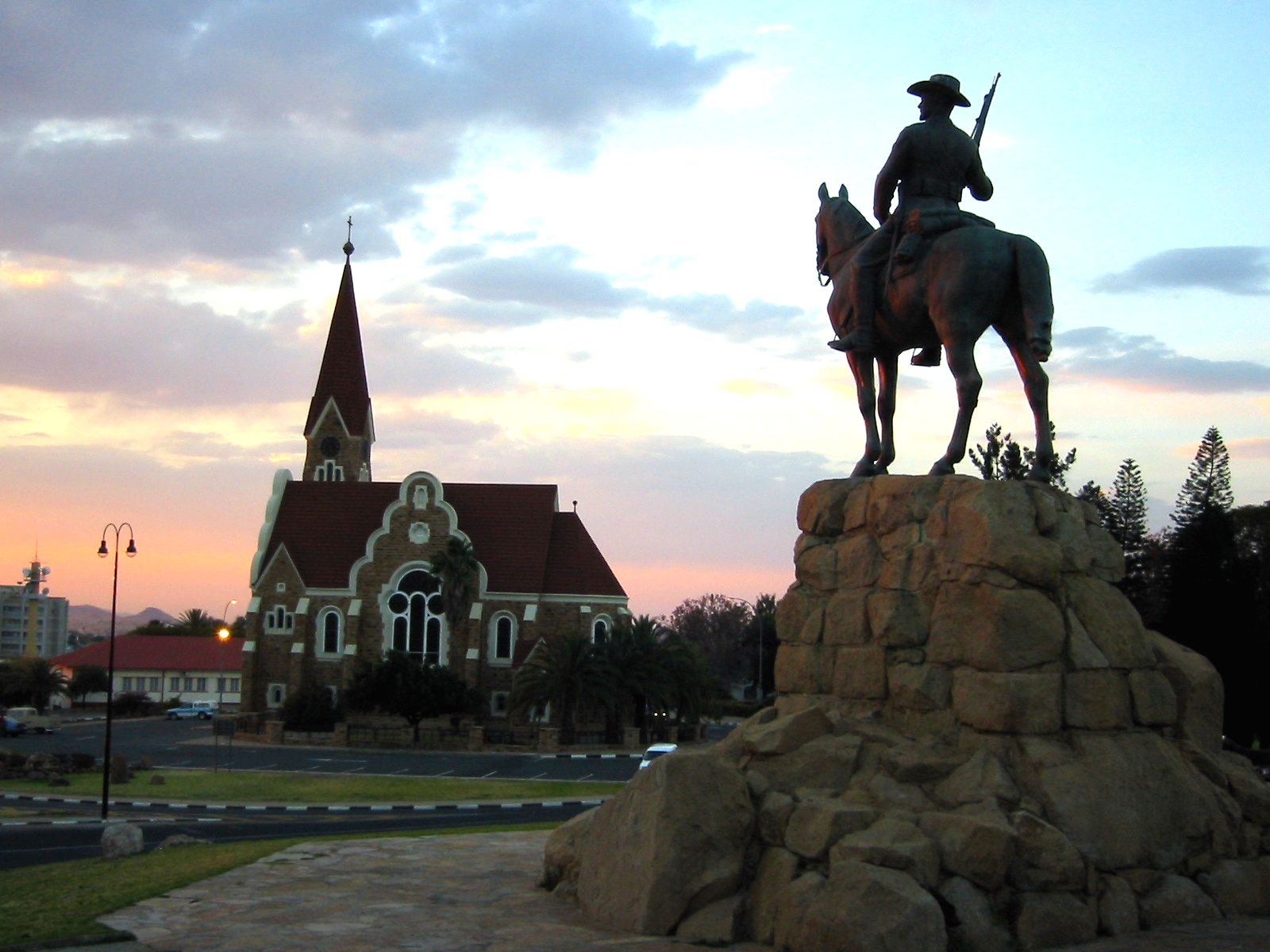
Reiterdenkmal in Windhoek before its relocation in 2009

== Netherlands ==
Amsterdam

- Equestrian statue of Queen Wilhelmina by Theresia van der Pant in the Rokin, 1975.

Breda

- Equestrian of Stadtholder Willem III.

The Hague

- Equestrian of King Willem II by Antonin Mercié, the replica of statue in Luxembourg.
- Equestrian of stadtholder William I in front of the Noordeinde Palace.
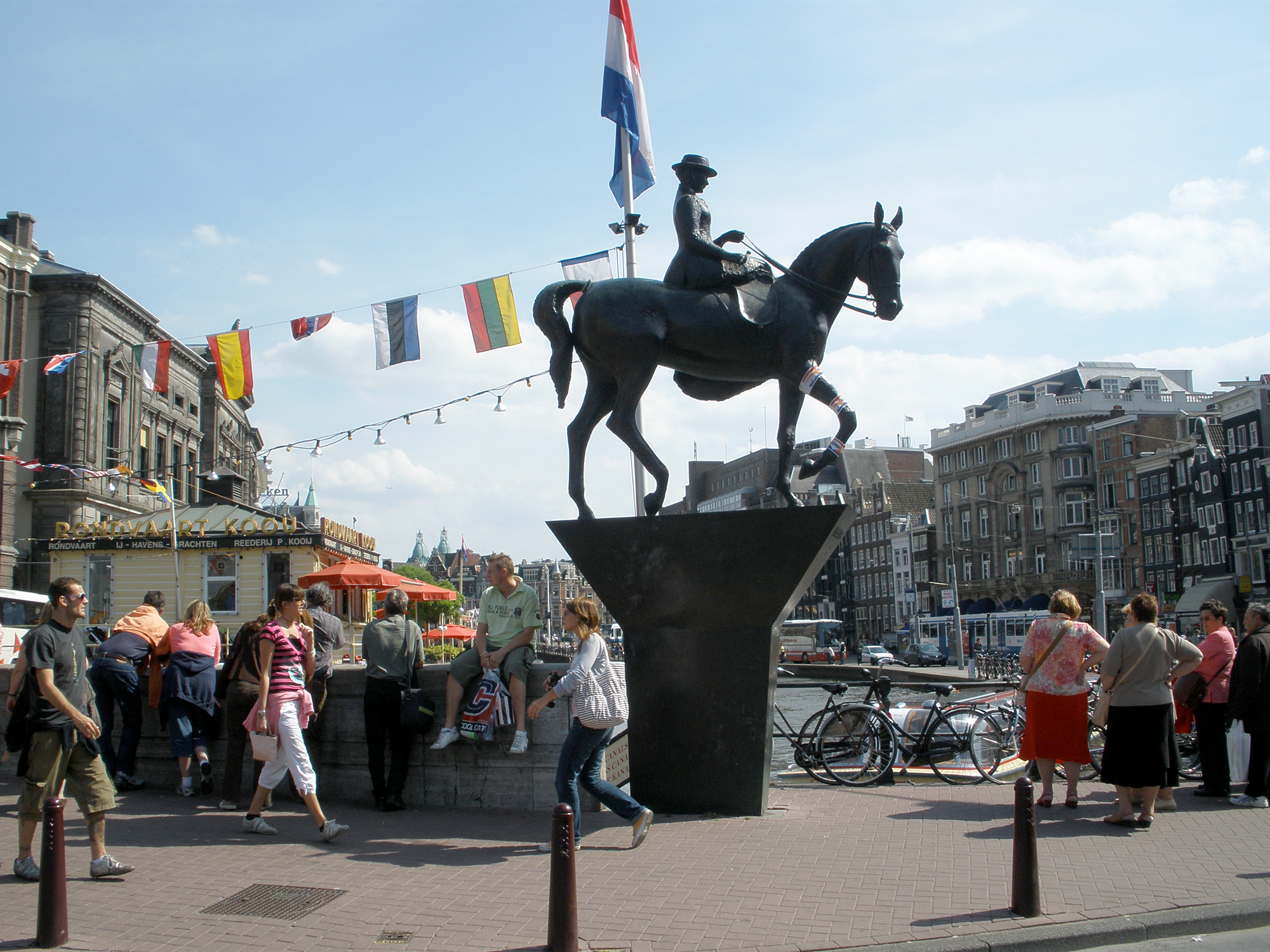
Queen regnant Wilhelmina in Amsterdam

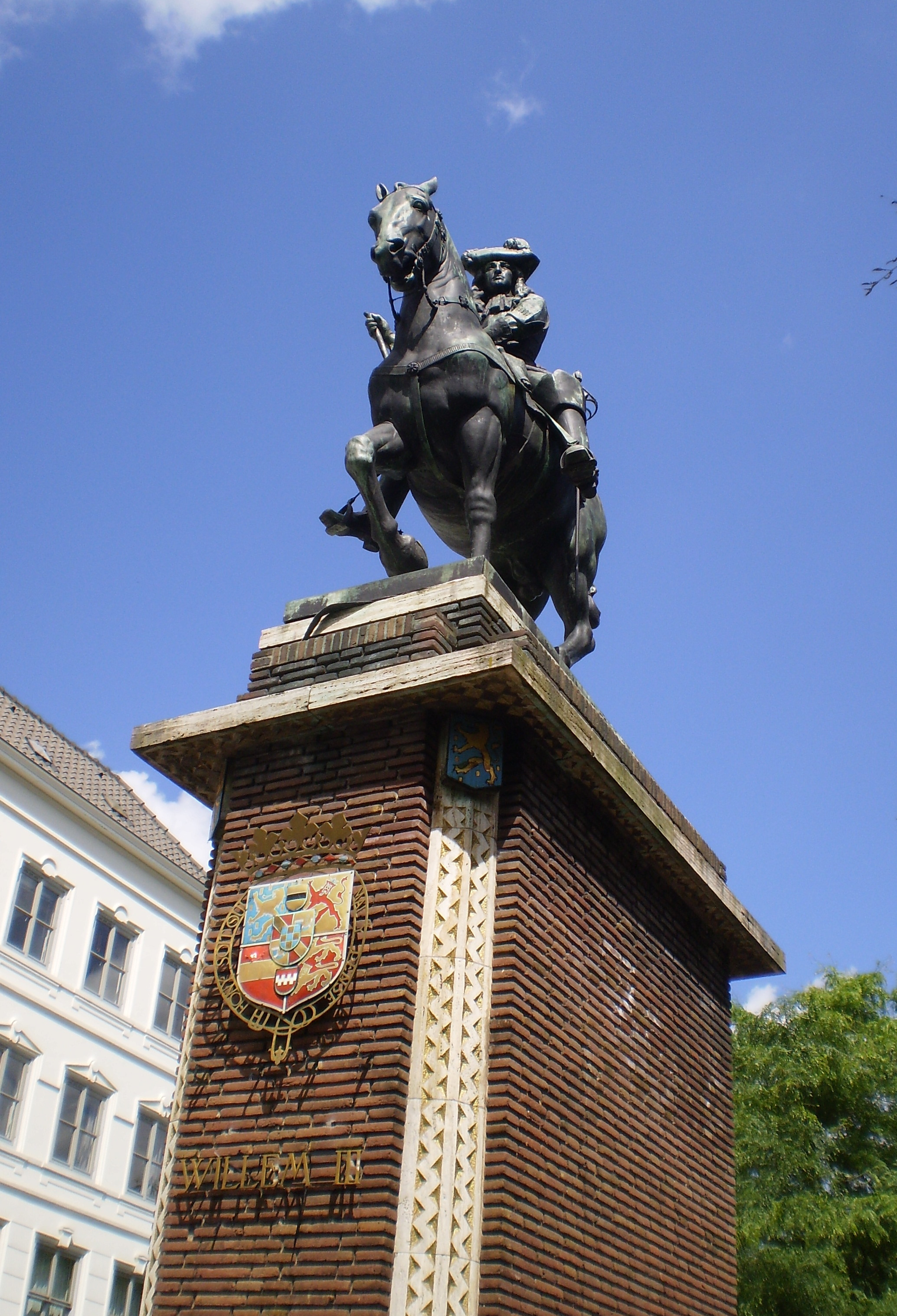
Stadtholder Willem III in Breda

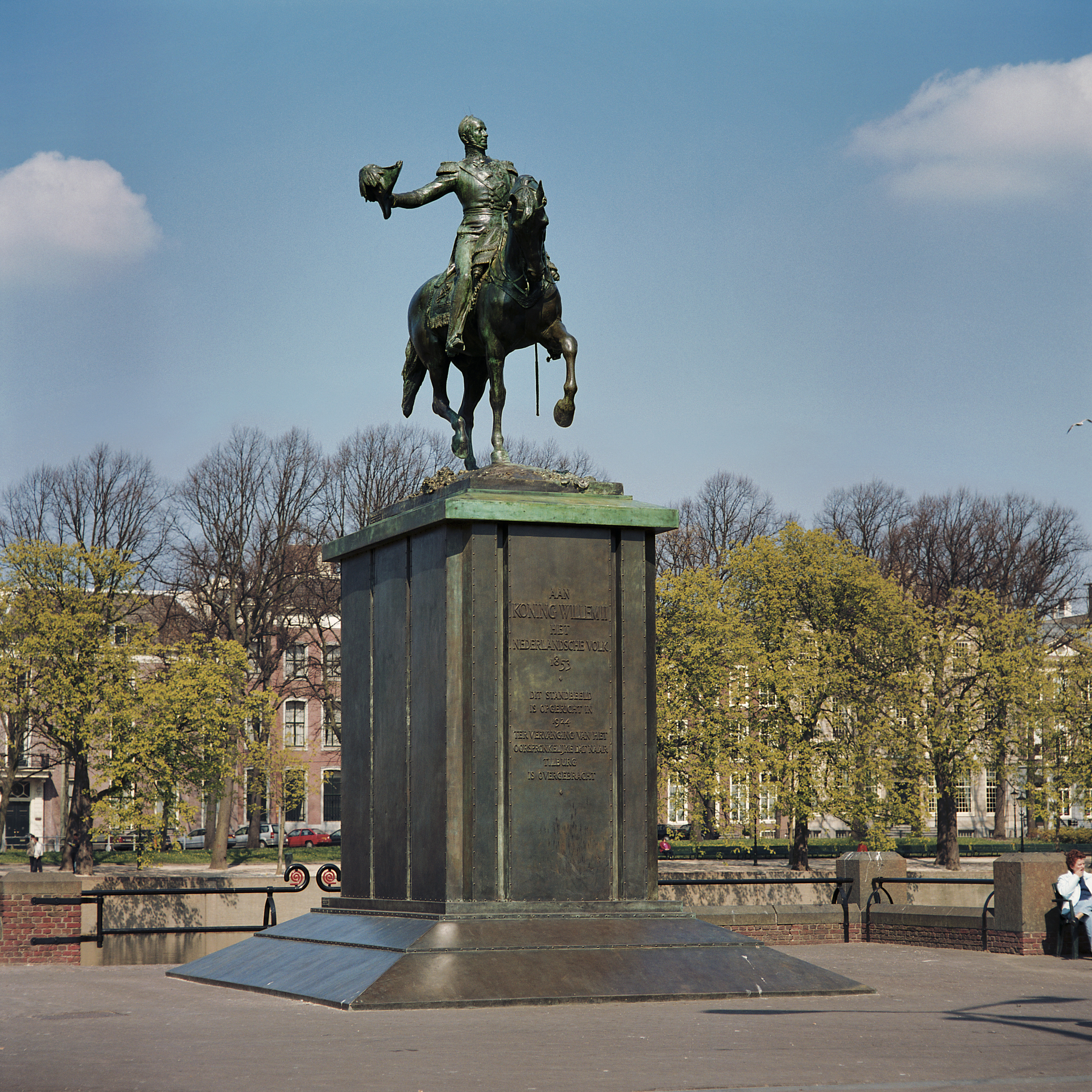
King Willem II in The Hague

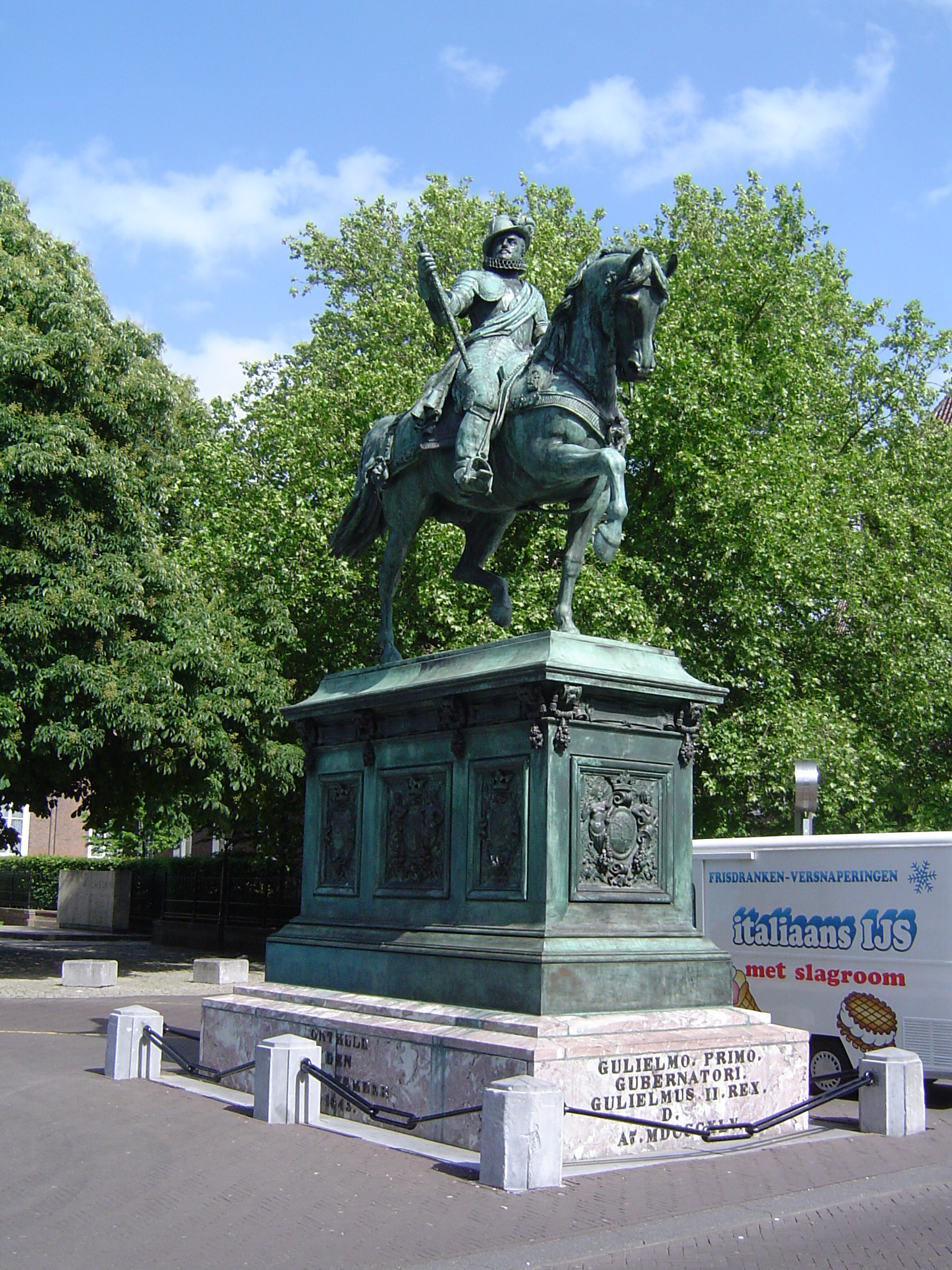
William I in The Hague

Katwijk aan den Rijn

- De schutter (man on horse) by G.Brouwer, 1986.

Nijmegen

- Equestrian with no identifying plaque on a pillar near the railway station

Rotterdam

- Equestrian of Count Willem IV by Willem Verbon, 1950.

Utrecht

- Equestrian of Saint Willibrordus by Albert Termote at the Janskerkhof, 1941.
- Equestrian of Saint Martinus by Albert Termote, 1948.
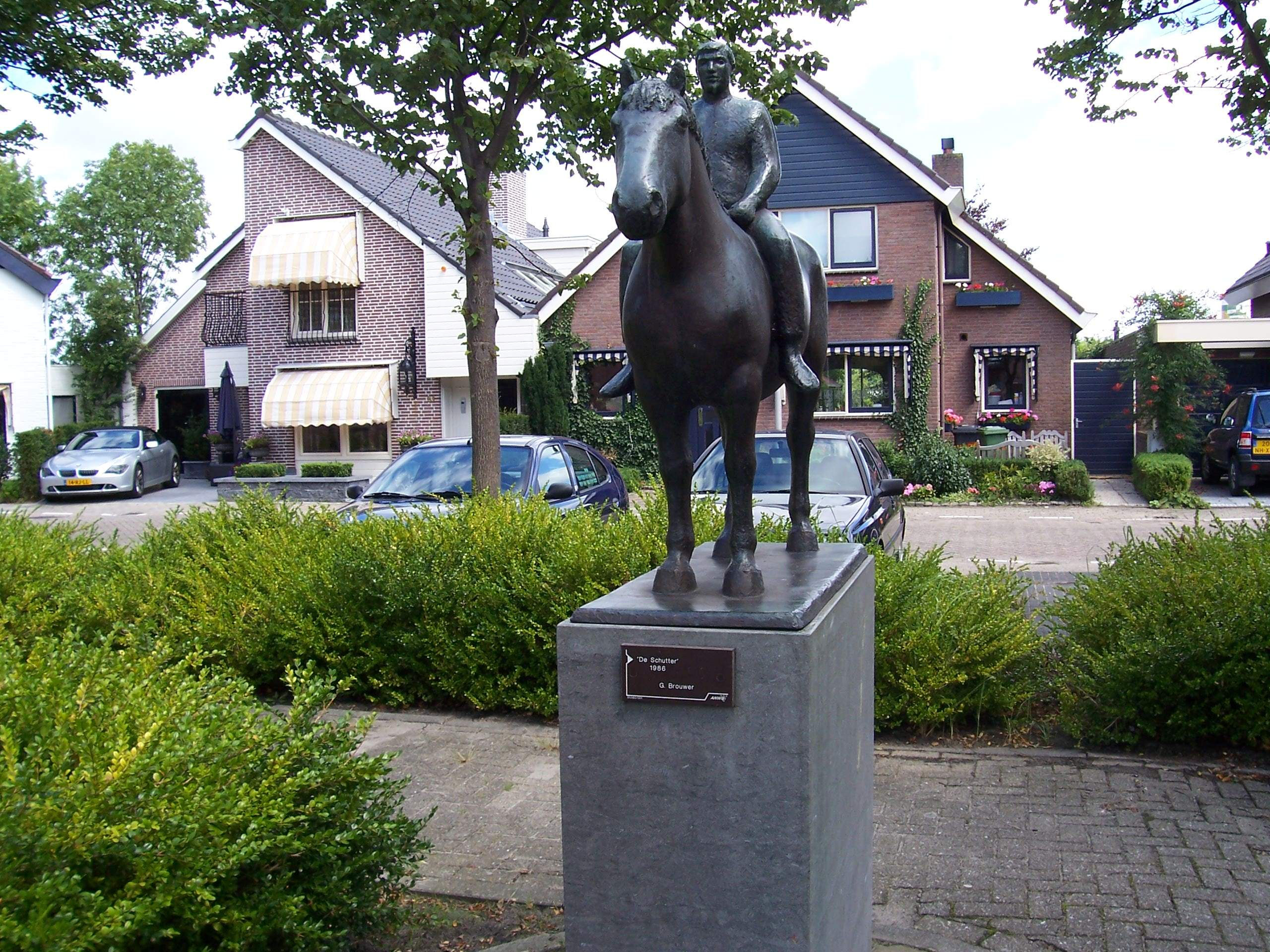
De schutter in Katwijk aan den Rijn

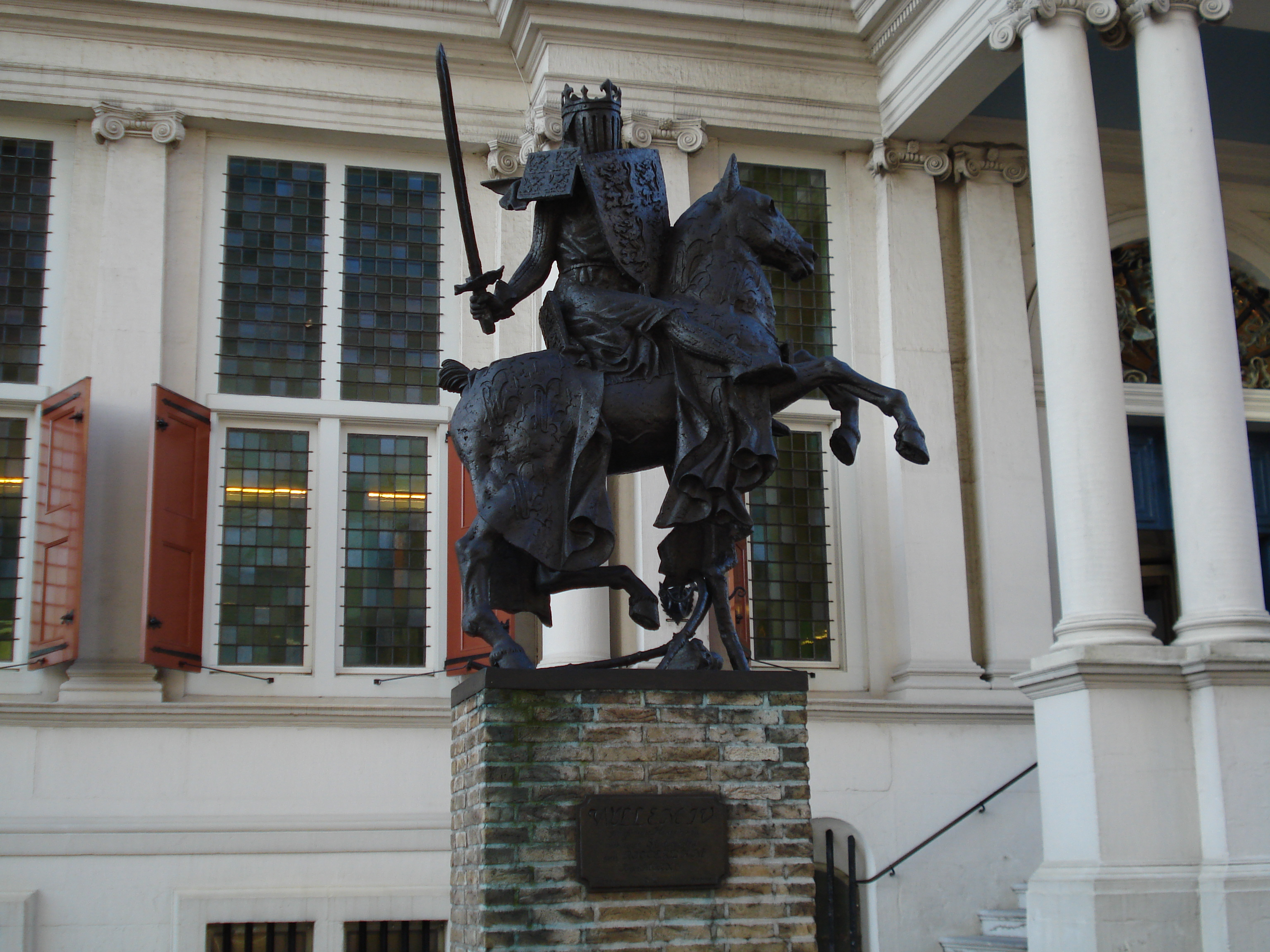
Count Willem IV in Rotterdam

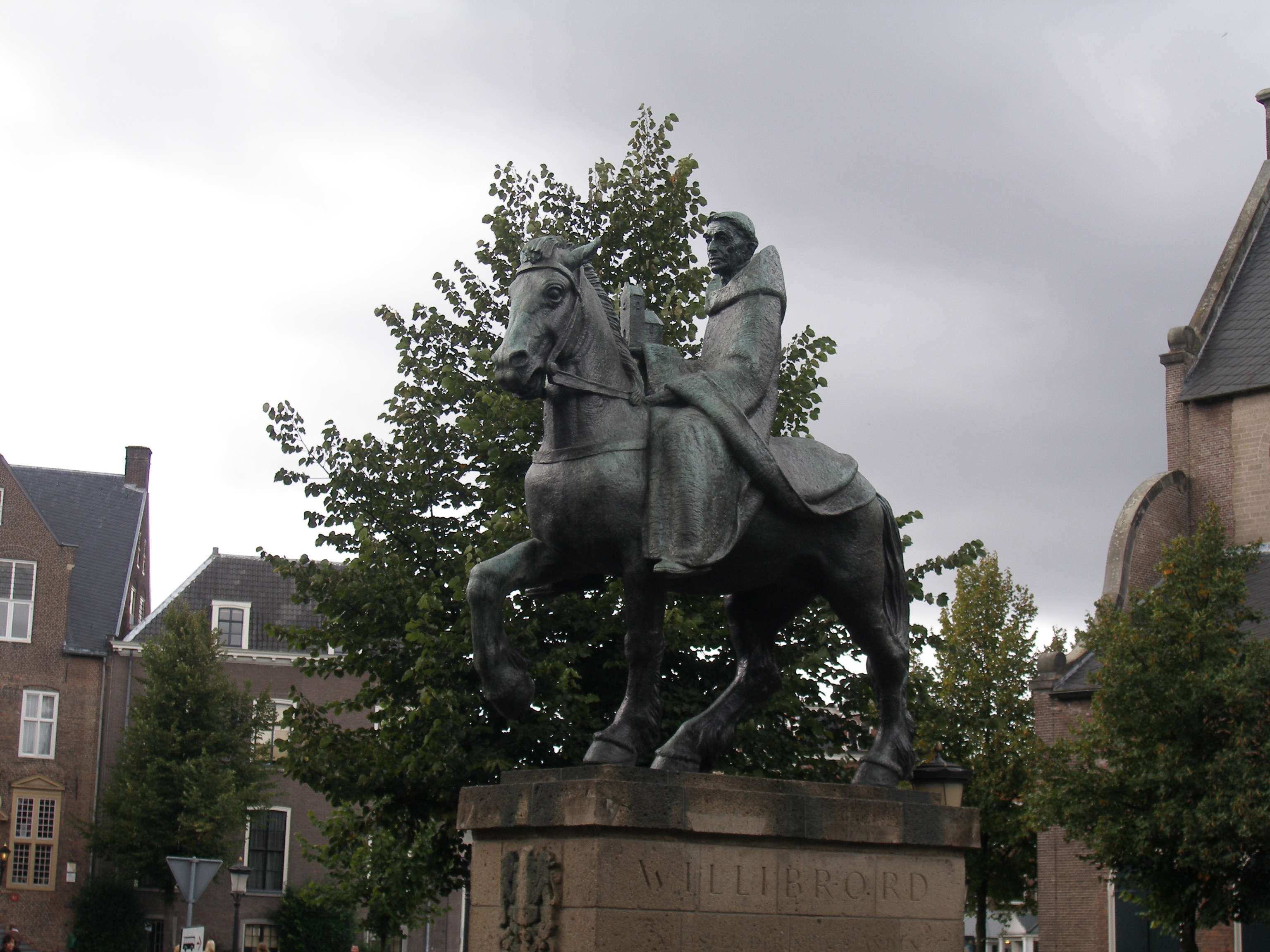
Saint Willibrordus in Utrecht

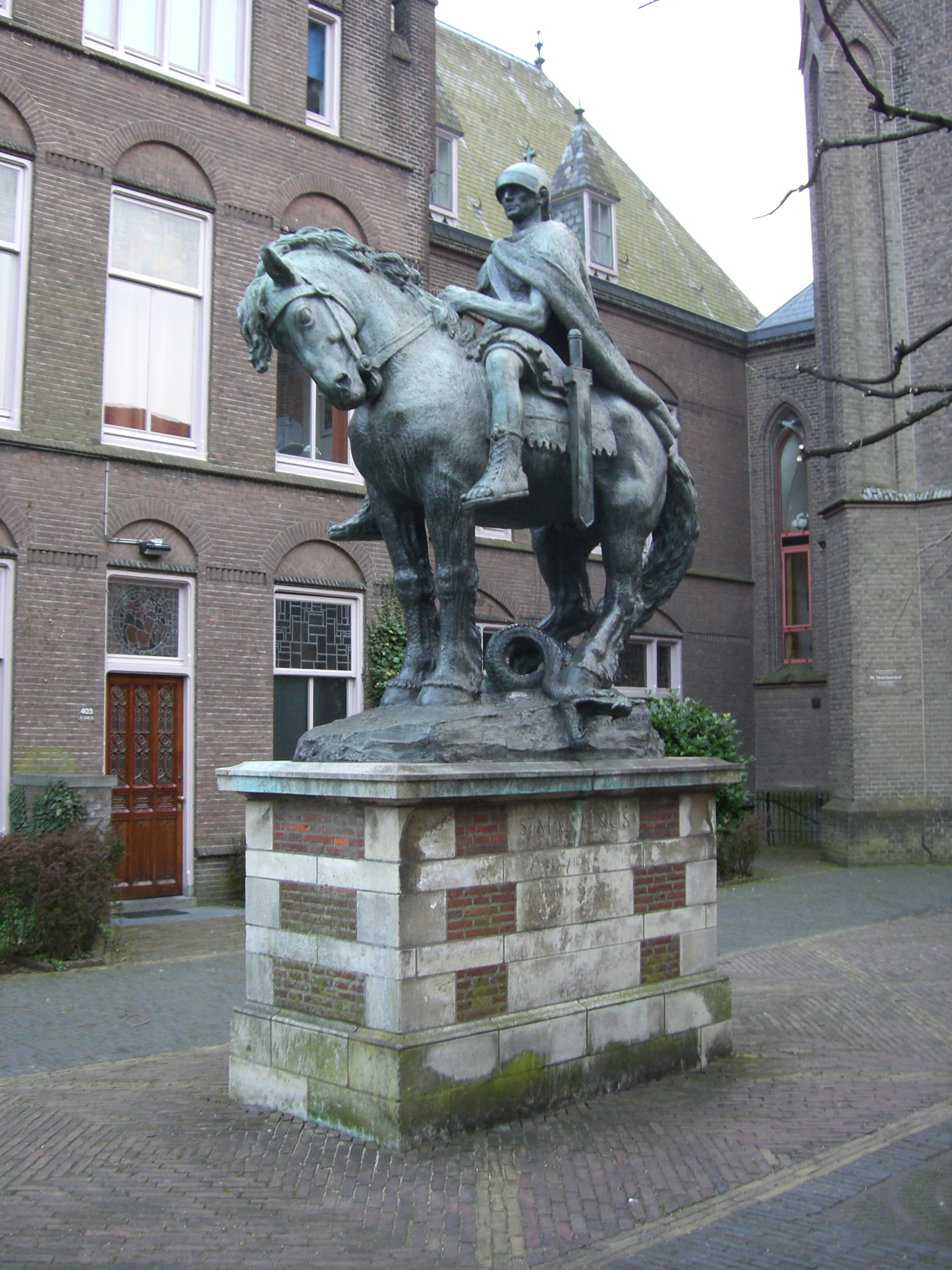
Saint Martinus in Utrecht

== North Korea ==
Pyongyang

- Chollima Statue on Mansu Hill, 1961.
- King Dongmyeong of Goguryeo equestrian statue at Tomb of King Tongmyong.

== Norway ==
Oslo

- Equestrian monument of King Karl XIV John of Sweden (Karl III John of Norway), at The Royal Palace, by Brynjulf Larsen Bergslien.
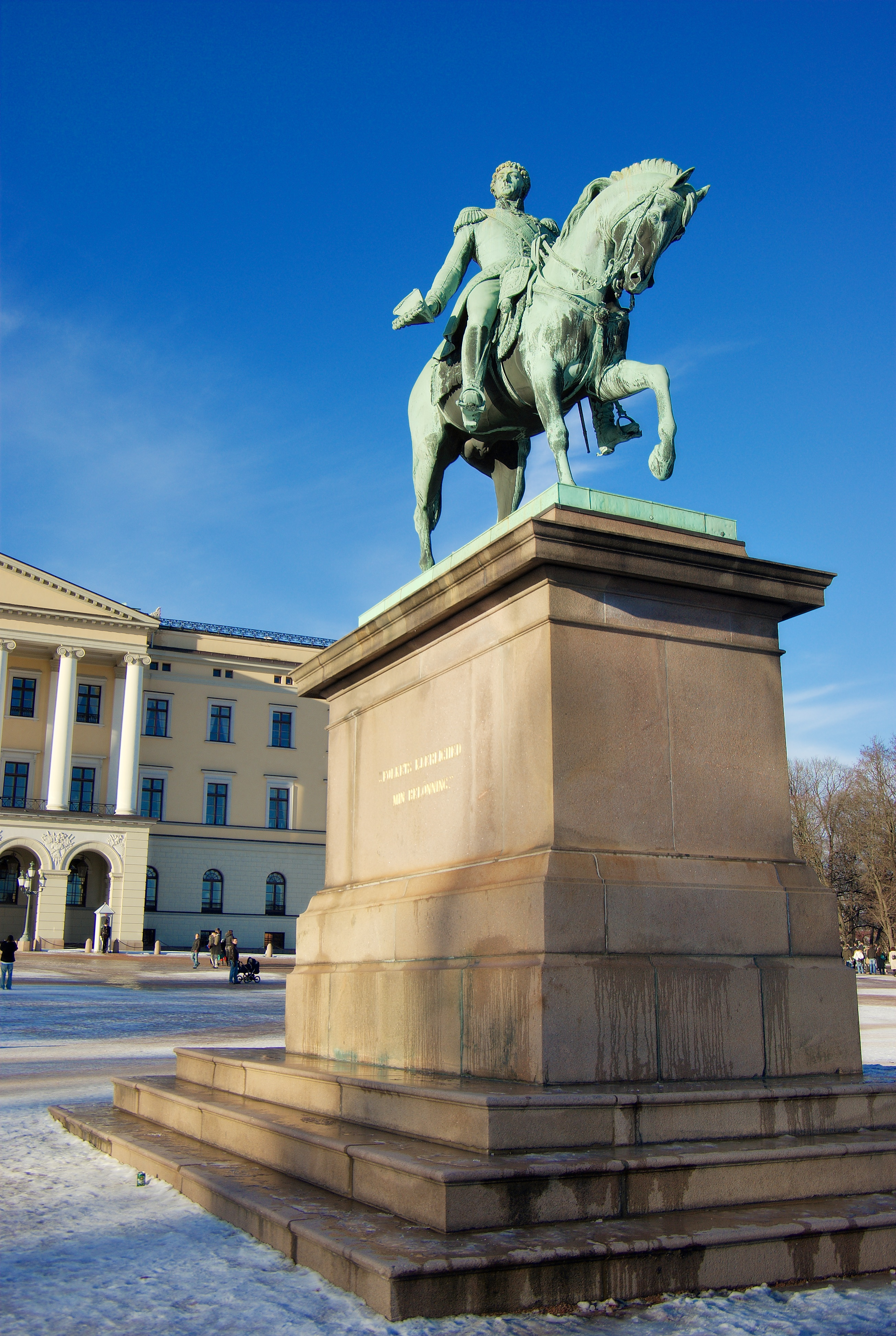
King Karl XIV, Oslo

== Philippines ==
Image	Portrayed person	Location	Date	Sculptor	Coordinates	Note
	Gabriela Silang	Makati		Jose Mendoza	14°33′18.1″N 121°01′27.4″E	
	Martin Delgado	Iloilo City	2019	Ginés Serrán-Pagán	10°43′05.8″N 122°32′52.6″E	

== Peru ==
Lima

- Equestrian of Francisco Pizarro by Charles Cary Rumsey in the Pasaje Santa Rosa.
- Equestrian of José de San Martín by Mariano Benlliure at the Plaza San Martín (Lima).
- Equestrian of Simón Bolivar by Adamo Tadolini at the Legislative Palace (Peru).
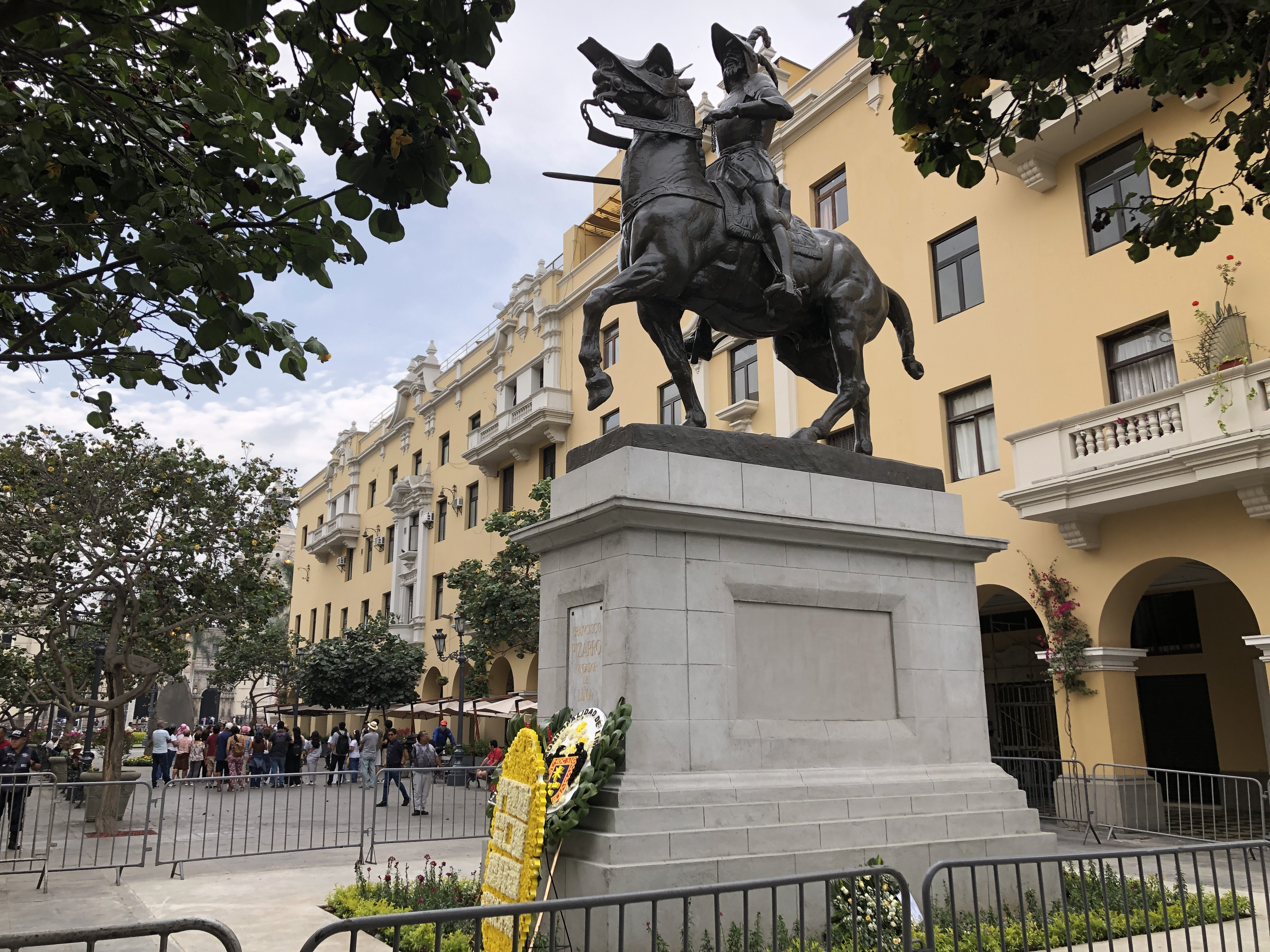
Francisco Pizarro in Lima

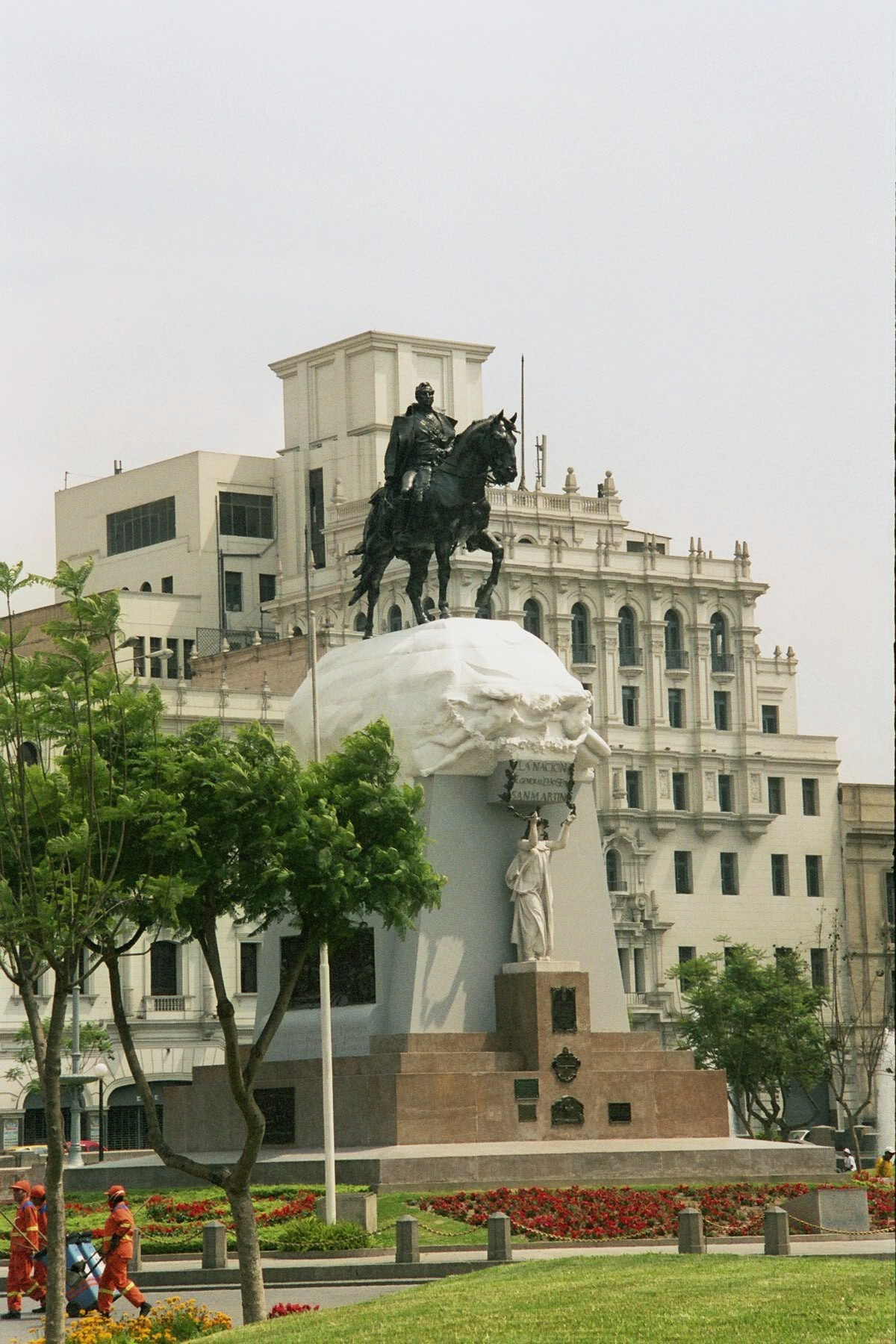
José de San Martín in Lima

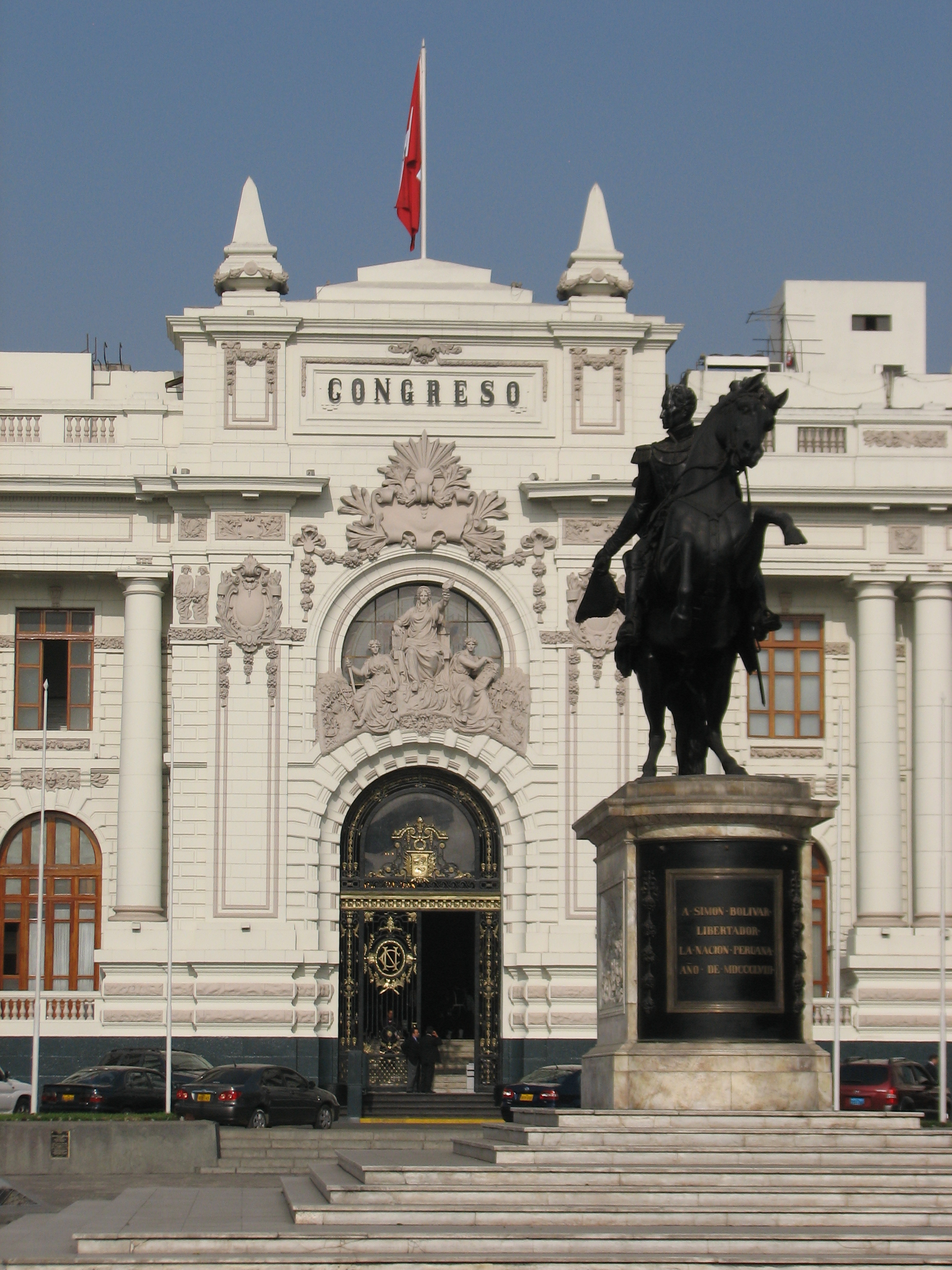
Simón Bolivar in Lima

== Portugal ==
Braga

- Equestrian statue of Saint Longinus in Bom Jesus do Monte, 1819 (made of Granite).
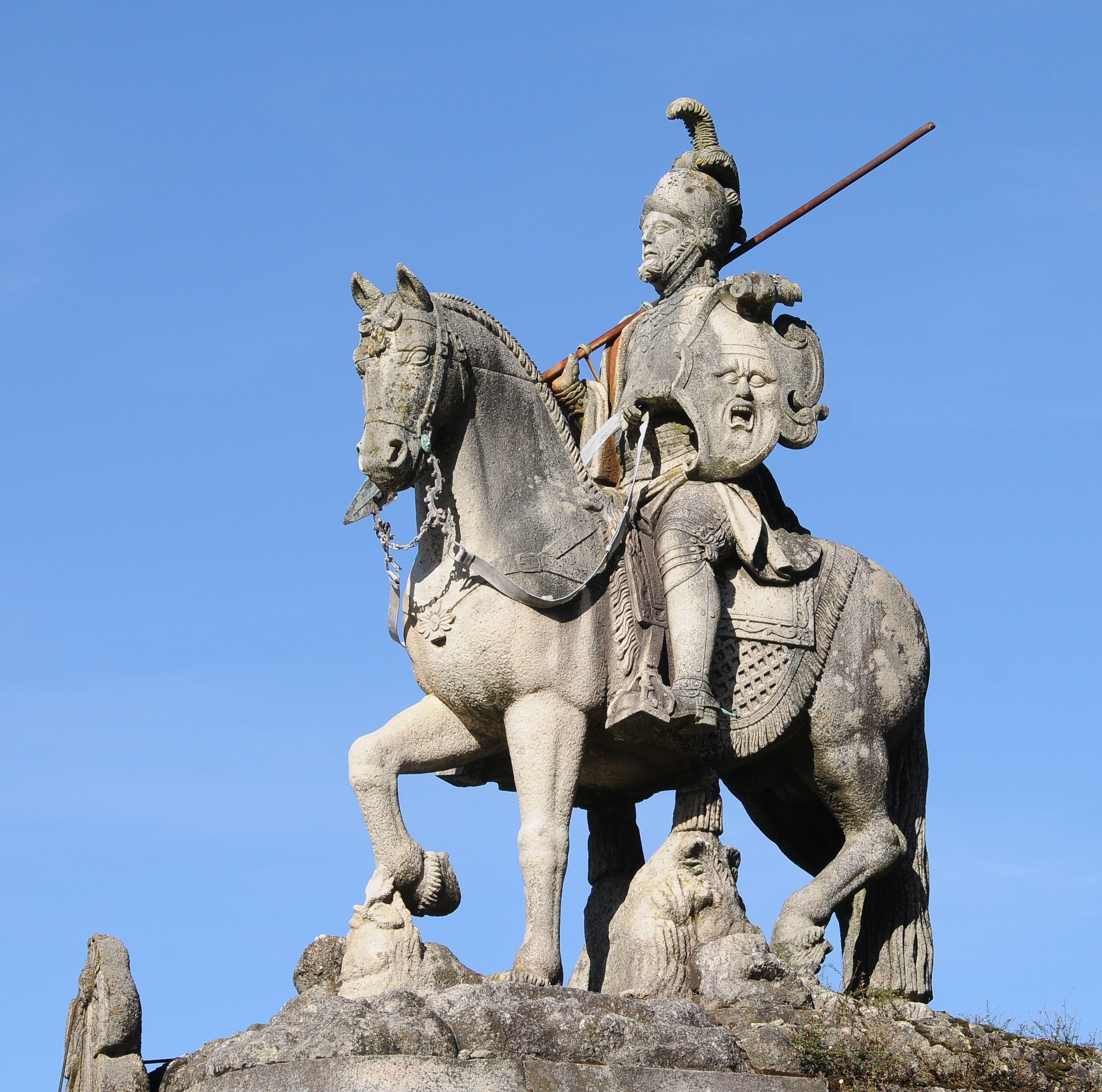

Lisbon

- Equestrian statue of King José I by Joaquim Machado de Castro at the Praça do Comércio, 1775.
- Equestrian statue of King João I by Leopoldo de Almeida at the Praça da Figueira, 1971.

Batalha

- Equestrian statue of Nuno Álvares Pereira close to Mosteiro Santa Maria da Vitória.

Cantanhede

- Equestrian statue of General António Luís de Meneses.
King José I, Lisbon

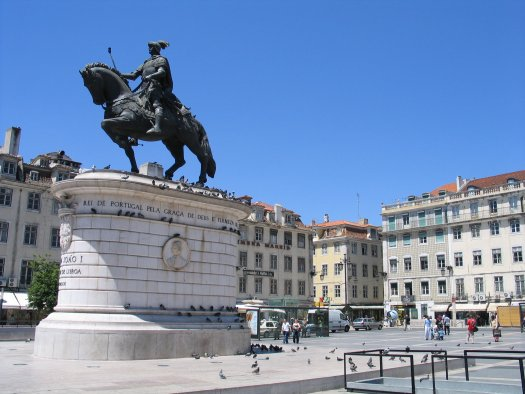
King João I, Lisbon

Nuno Álvares Pereira, Batalha

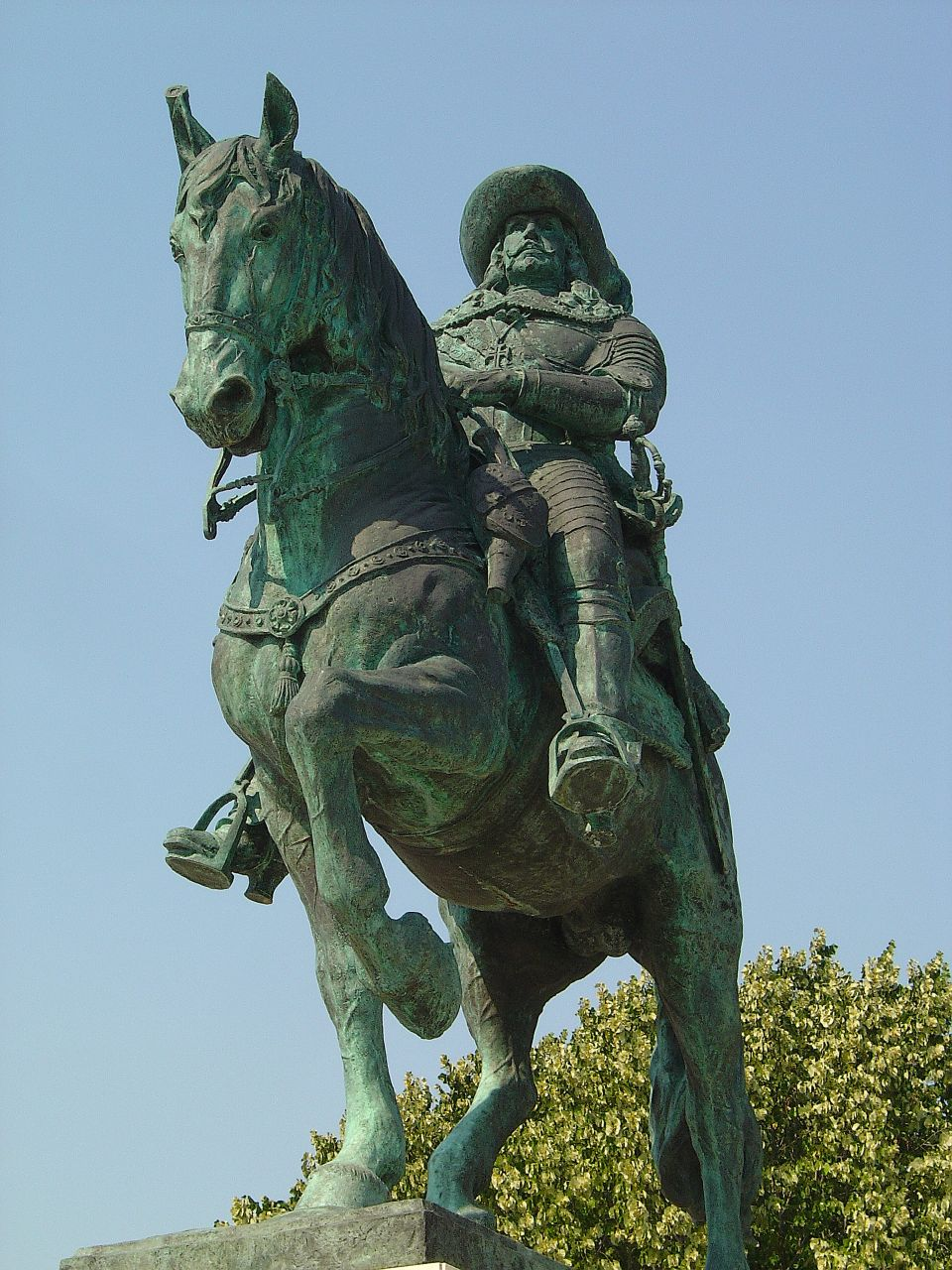
António Luís de Meneses, Cantanhede

Porto

- Equestrian statue of King Pedro IV at the Praça da Liberdade.
- Equestrian statue of King João VI at the João Gonçalves Zarco square.
- Equestrian statue of Vímara Peres by Barata Feyo in front of the Oporto Cathedral, 1968.

Vila Viçosa

- Equestrian statue of King João IV in front of the Paço Ducal de Vila Viçosa.
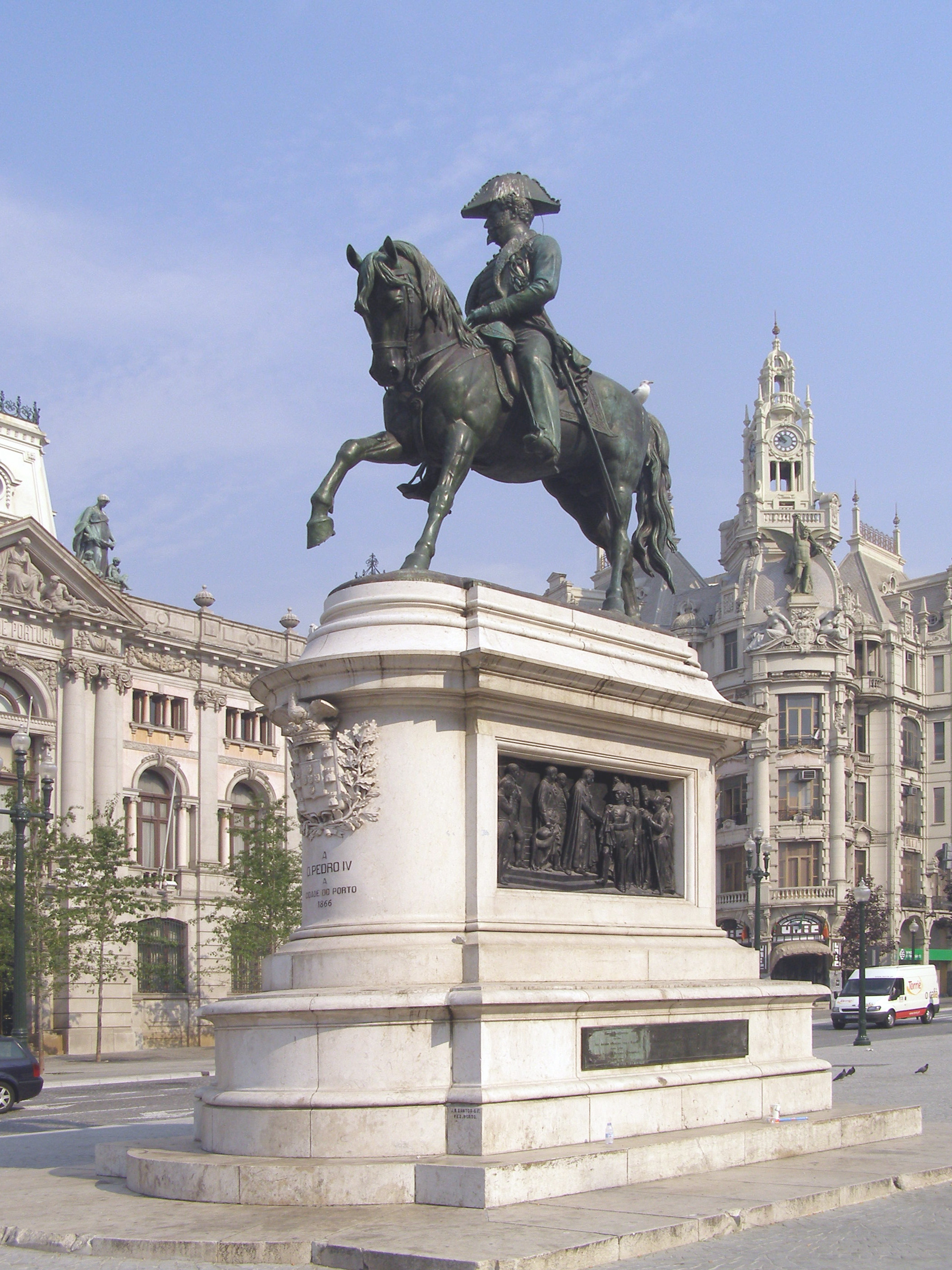
King Pedro IV, Porto

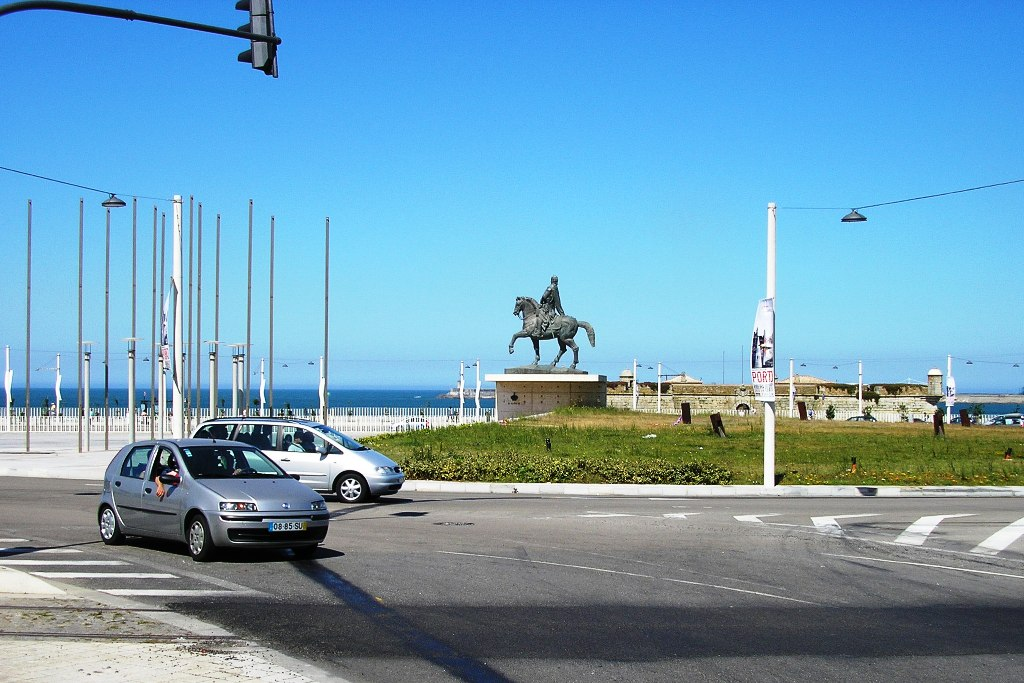
King João VI, Porto

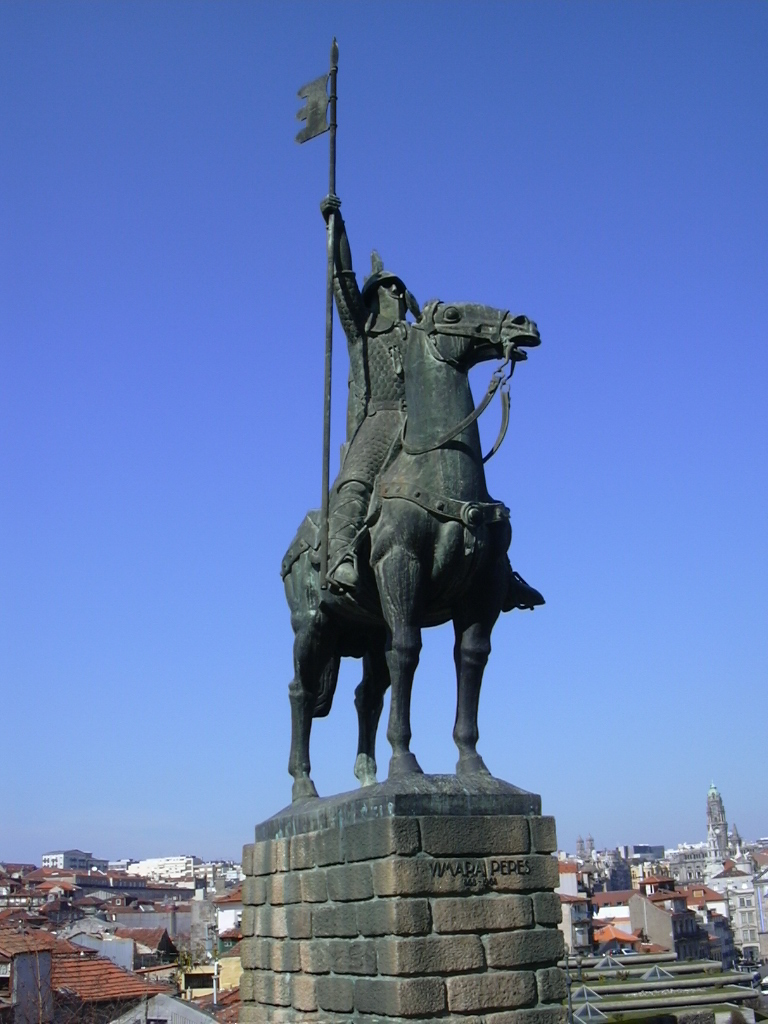
Vímara Peres, Porto

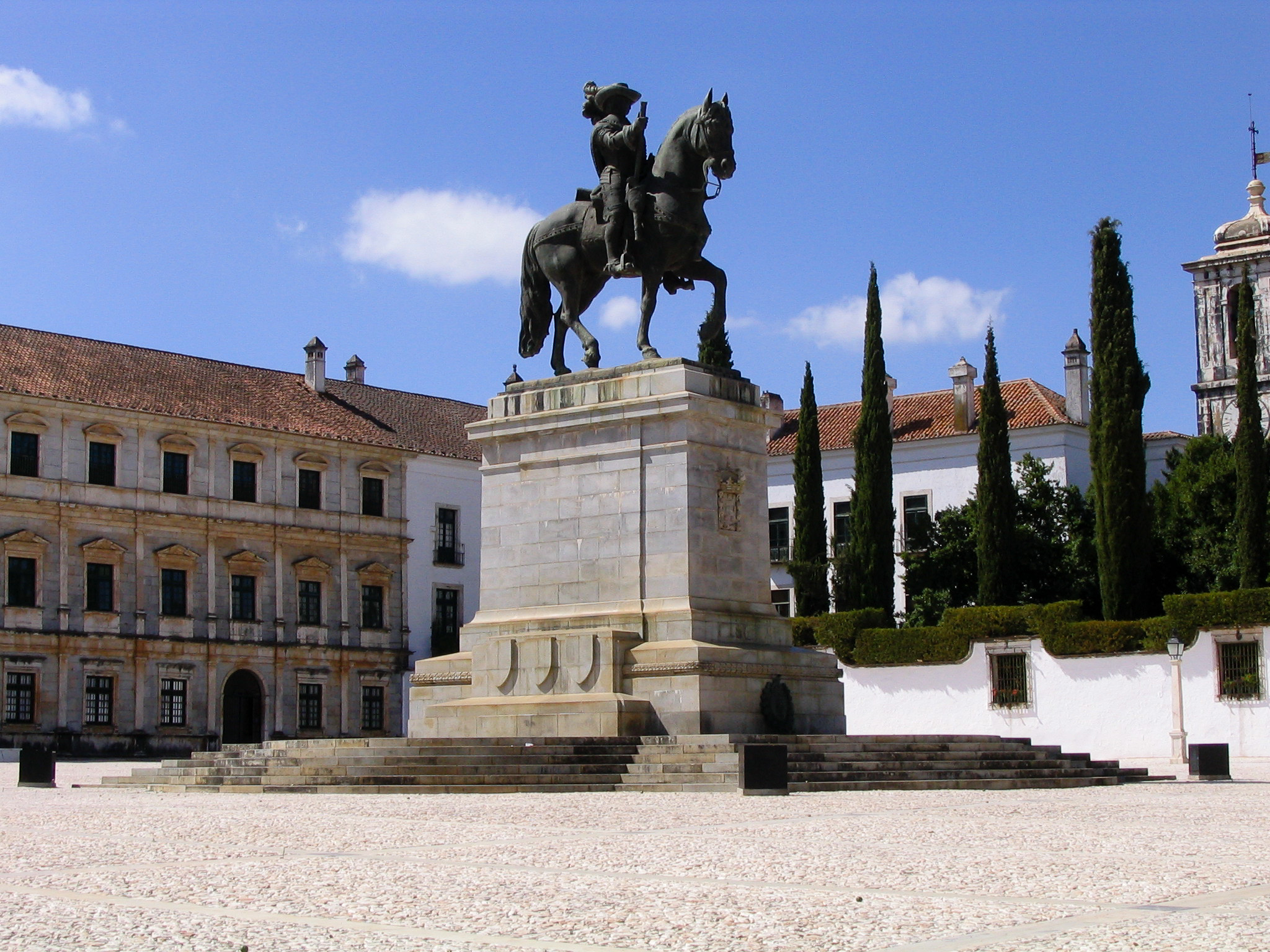
King João IV, Vila Viçosa

== Romania ==
Bucharest

- Equestrian Statue of Michael the Brave at the University Square, 1874.
- Equestrian Statue of Carol I, 1939, by Ivan Meštrović, destroyed by the communists after 1948
- Equestrian Statue of Ferdinand I, 1940, by Ivan Meštrović, destroyed by the communists after 1948
- Equestrian Statue of Saint George, 1940, destroyed by the communists after 1948
- Equestrian Statue of Carol I, 2010, by Florin Codre
- Equestrian Statue of Michael the Brave at the Michael the Brave 30th Guards Brigade, 2015

Cluj-Napoca

- Equestrian Monument of Matthias Corvinus, 1902
- Equestrian Statue of Saint George, 1904
- Equestrian Statue of Michael the Brave, 1976

Focşani

- Equestrian Statue of Alexander Suvorov at the battlefield of Battle of Rymnik. The first sculpture by Boris Eduards was erected in 1913, but was lost during WWI. A new sculpture by Marius Butunoiu was erected in 1959.

Iași

- Equestrian Statue of Stephen the Great, by Emmanuel Frémiet, in front of the Palace of Culture, 1883.
- Attacking Cavalryman Statue, by Ioan C. Dimitriu-Bârlad, in front of the Copou Park, 1927.
- Equestrian Statue of Michael the Brave, 2002.

Oradea

- Equestrian Statue of Ferdinand I, 1924, destroyed by the communists after 1948
- Equestrian Statue of Michael the Brave, 1994
- Equestrian Statue of Ferdinand I, 2019

Târgu Mureş

- Equestrian Statue of Avram Iancu by Florin Codre, 1978.
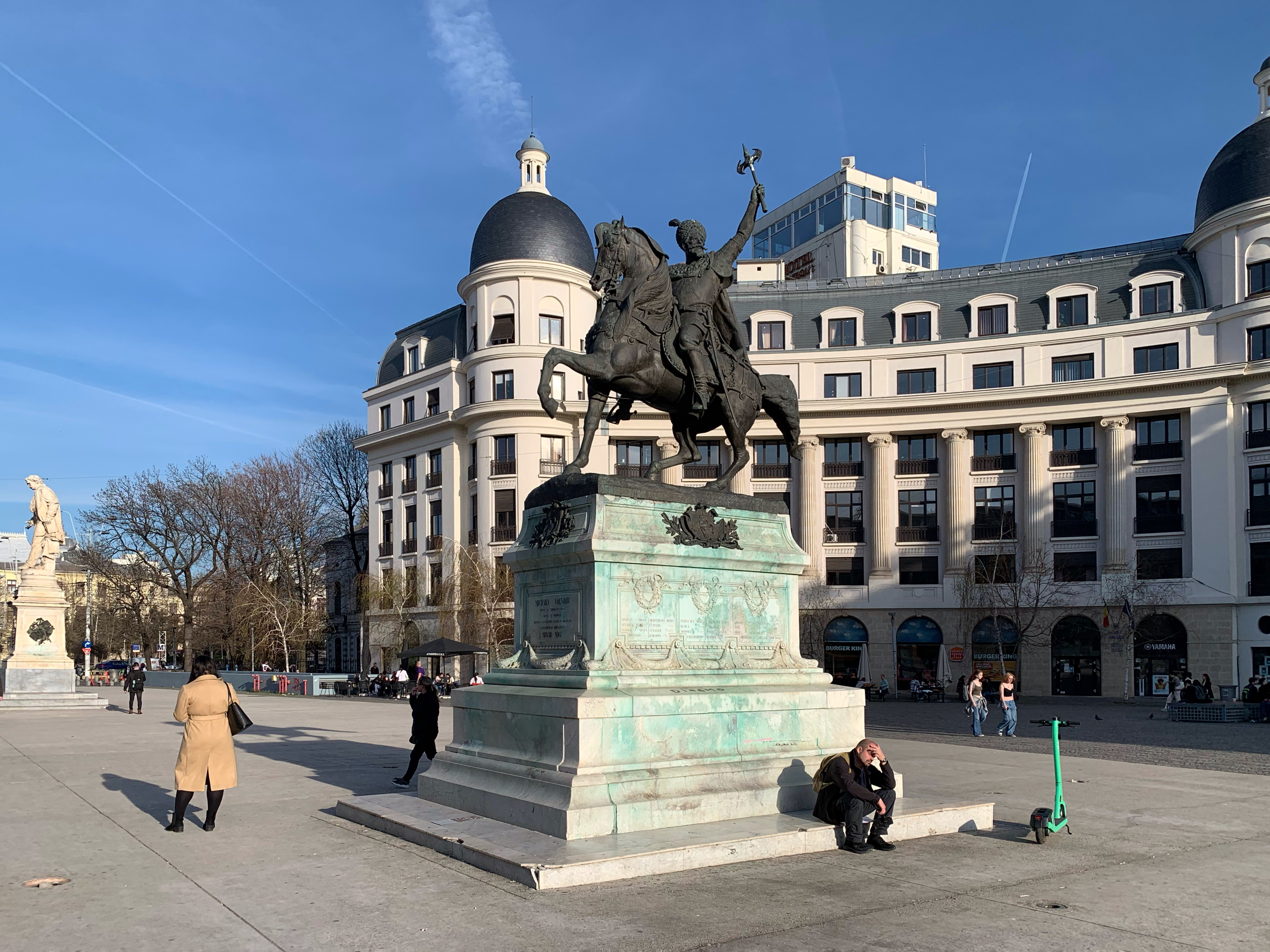
Michael the Brave at the University Square

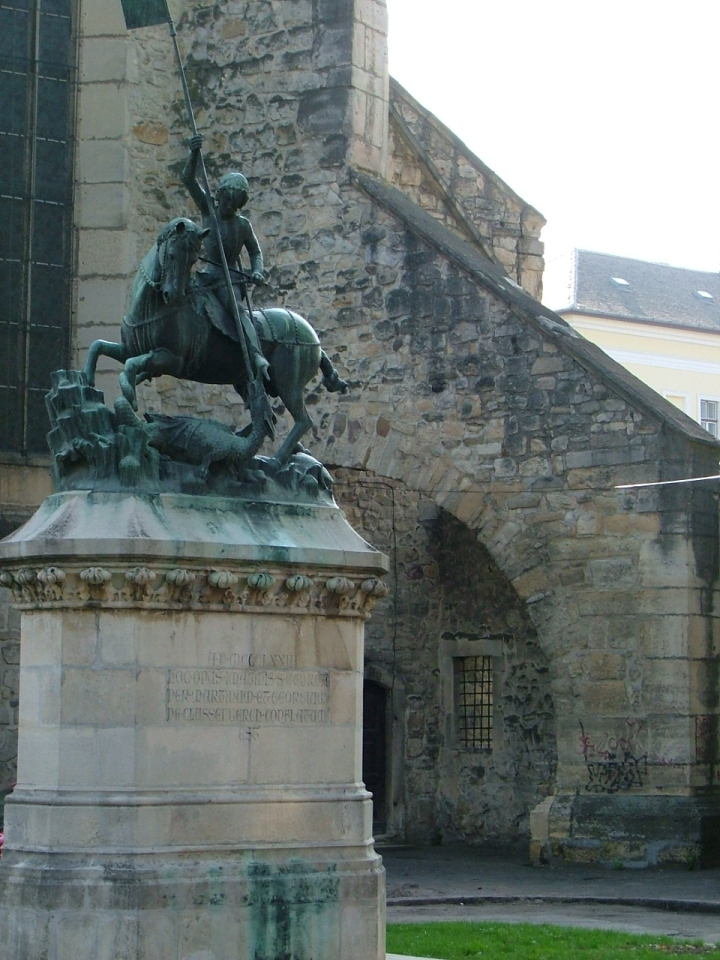
Saint George in Cluj-Napoca

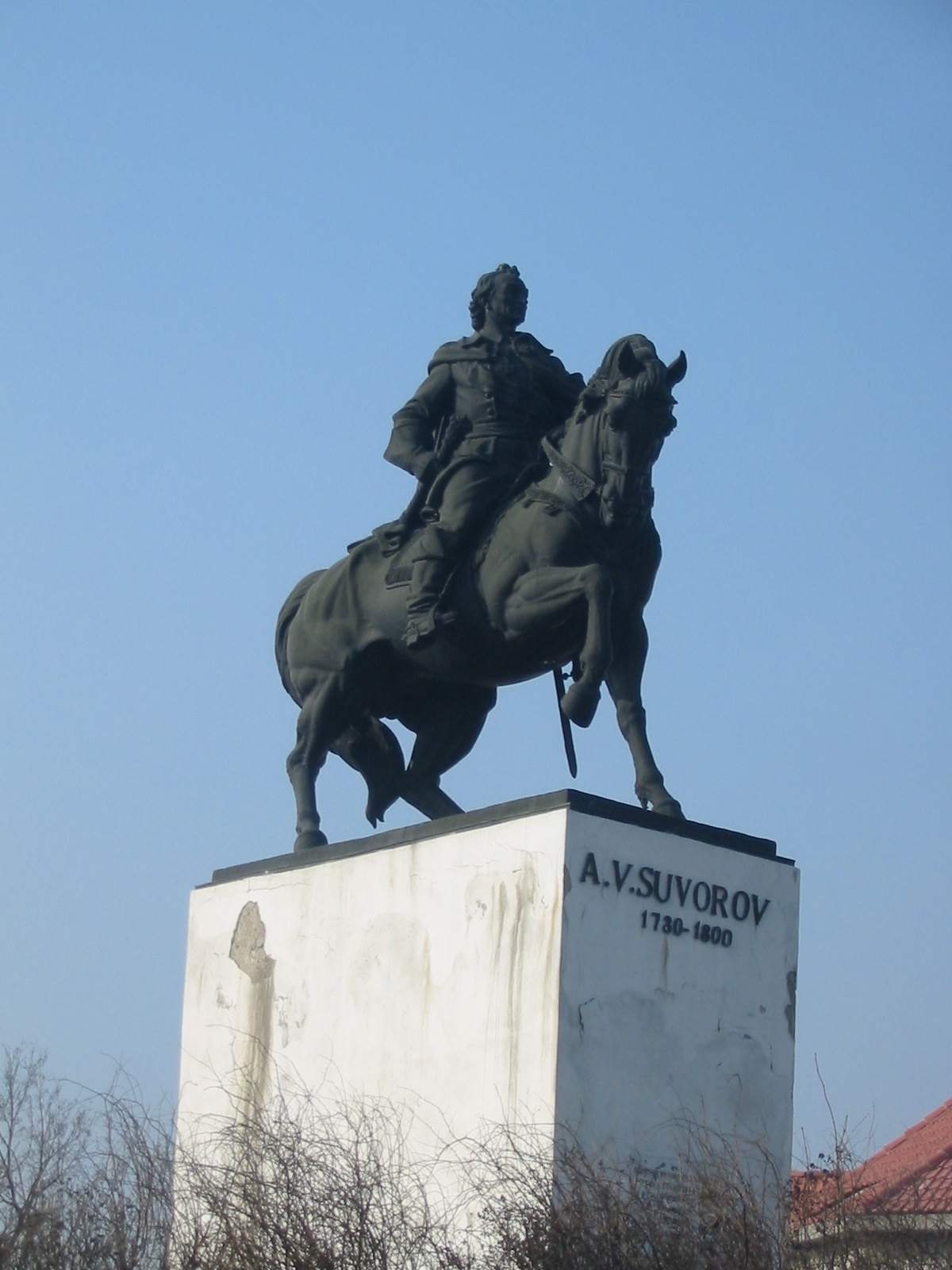
Alexander Suvorov near Focşani

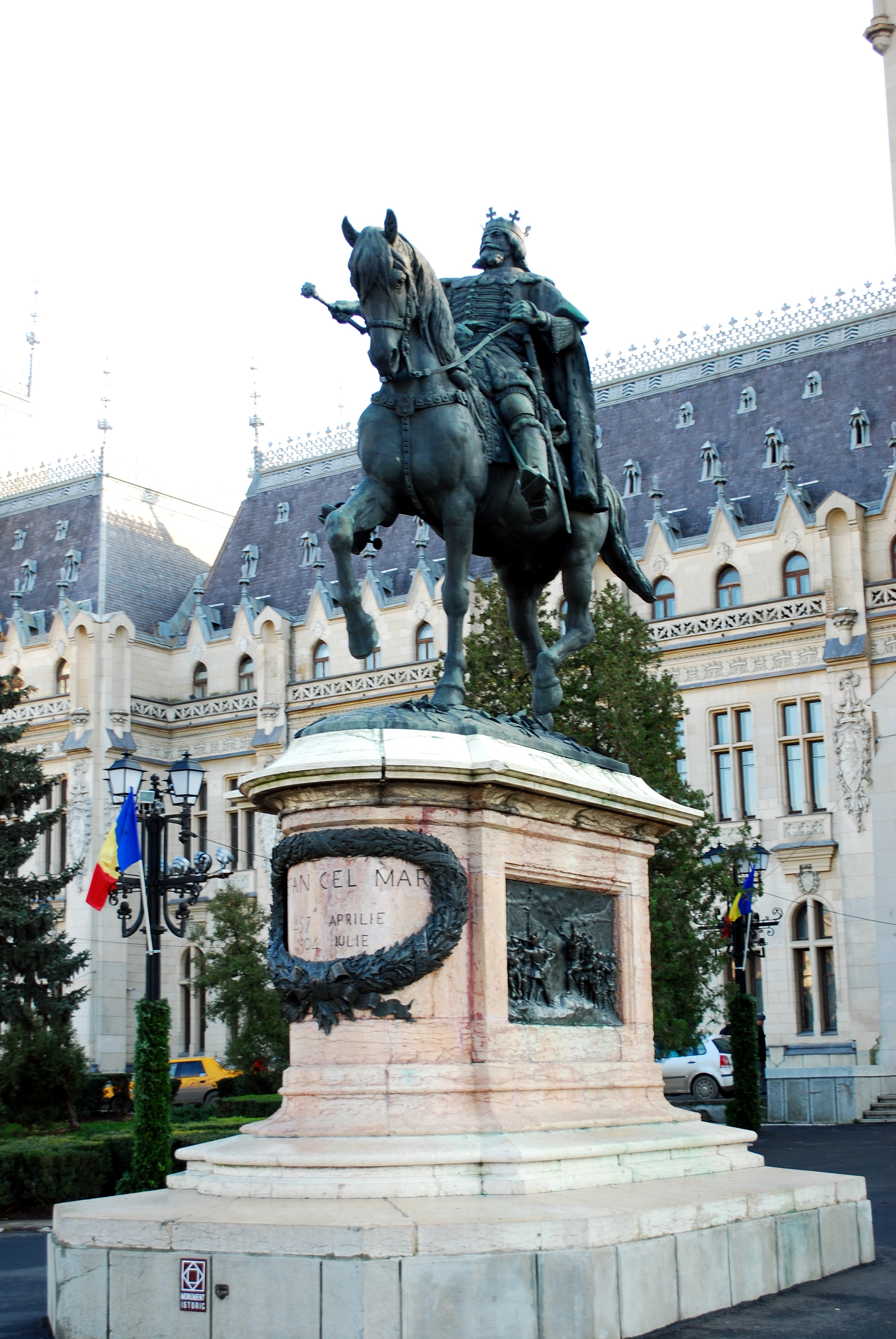
Stephen the Great in Iași

== Serbia ==
Belgrade

- Equestrian of Mihailo Obrenović III, Prince of Serbia by Enrico Pazzi at the Republic Square, 1882.

Niš

- Monument to the Liberators by Antun Augustinčić at the Oslobodjenje Square, 1937.
- Equestrian of King Aleksandar I Karađorđević by Radeta Stanković, 1939–1946 (demolished by communists), restored in 2004.

Novi Sad

- Equestrian Statue of King Petar I Karađorđević, 2018.

Zrenjanin

- Equestrian of King Petar I Karađorđević by Rudolf Valdec, 1926–1941 (demolished by Nazis during occupation), restored in 2004.

Kruševac

- Equestrian Statue of Despot Stefan Lazarević on Kosturnica Square
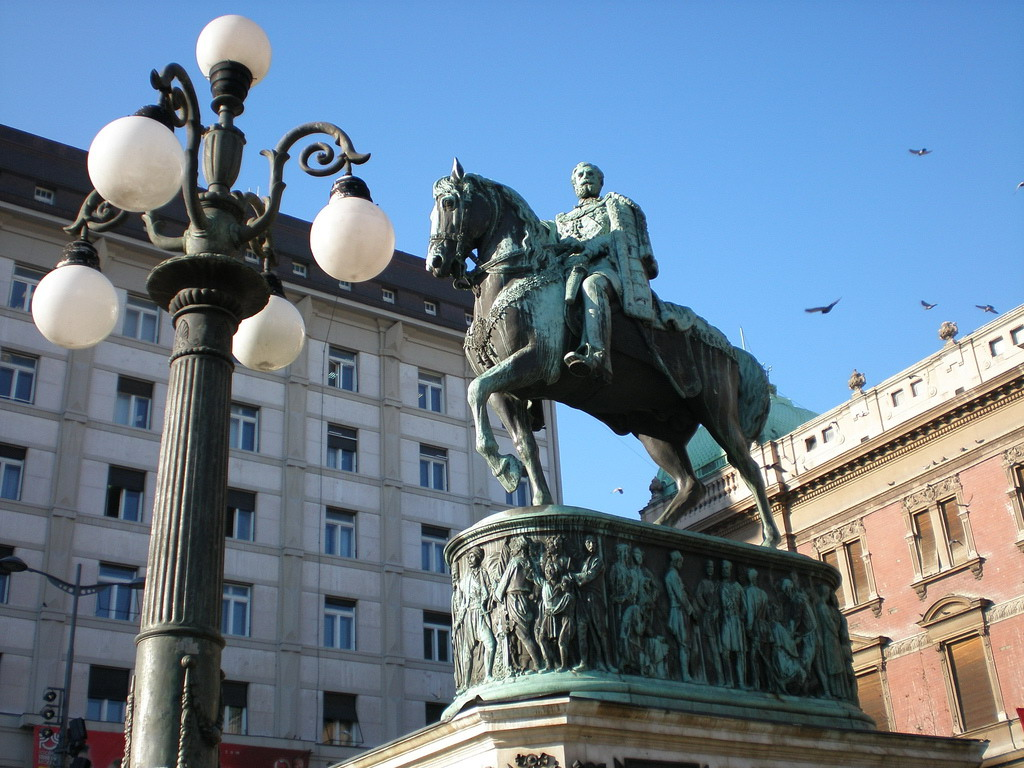
Prince Mihailo in Belgrade

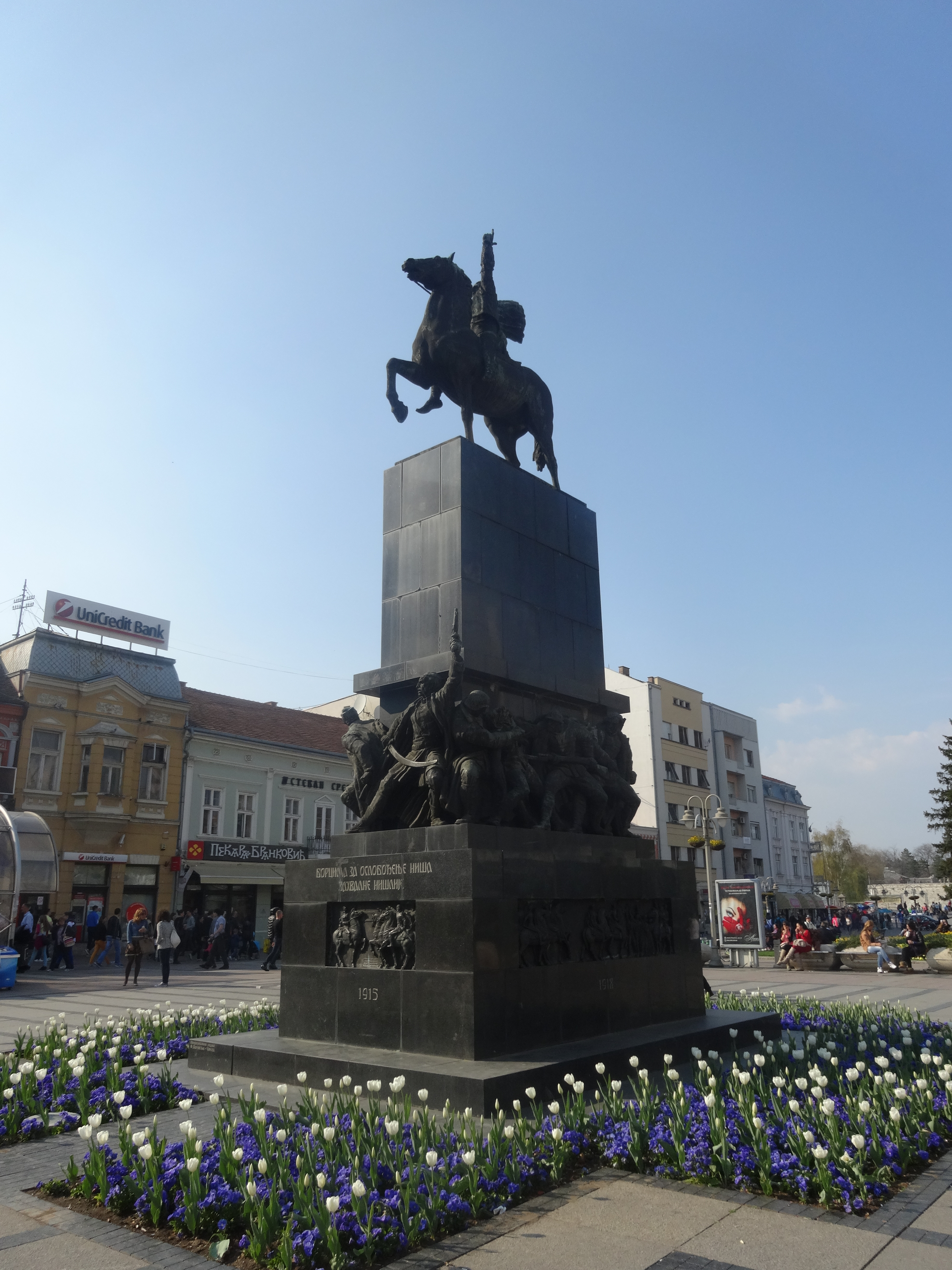
Monument to the liberators of Niš

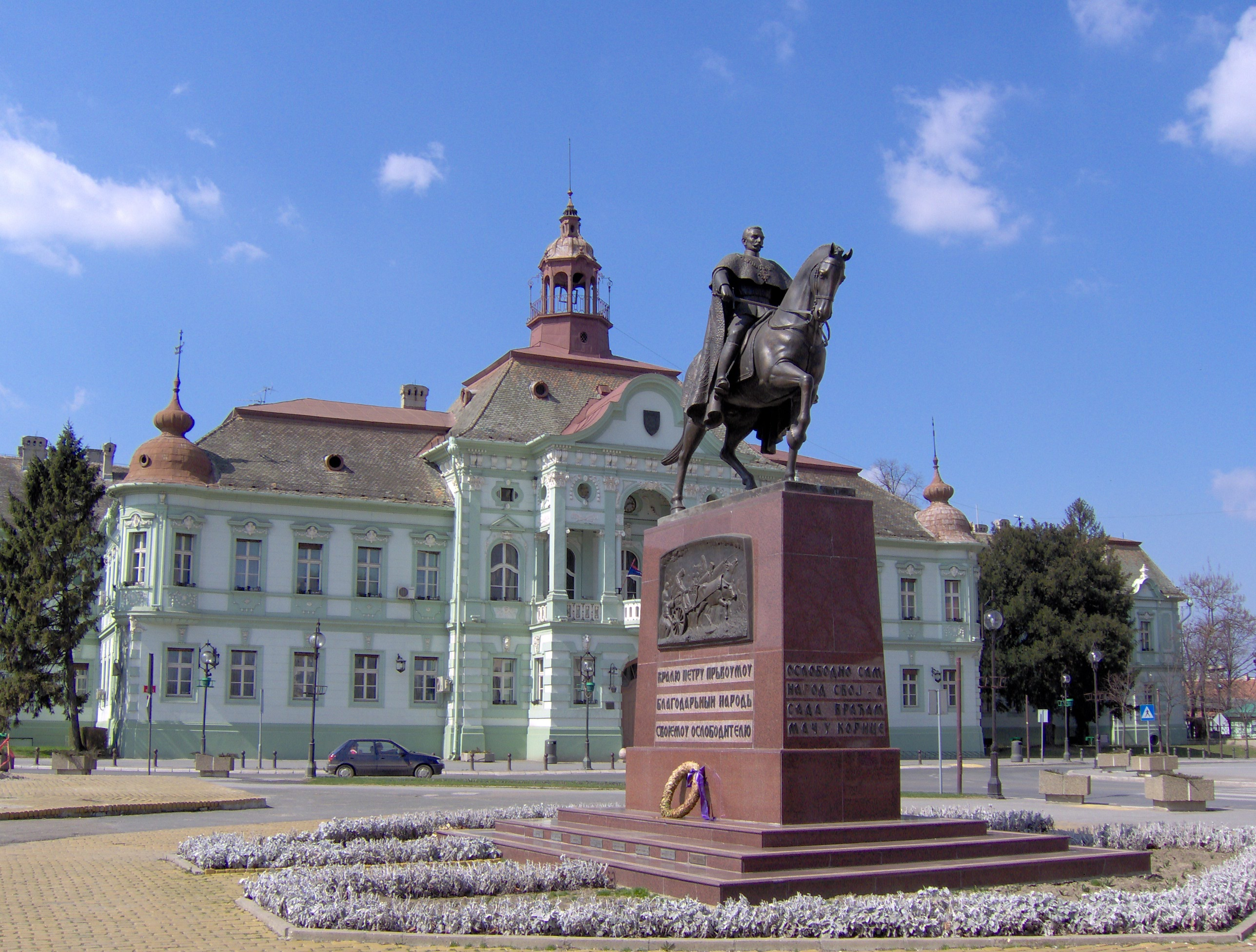
King Petar I Karađorđević in Zrenjanin

== Slovakia ==
Bratislava

- Equestrian statue of King Svätopluk I of Great Moravia at Bratislava Castle.
- Equestrian statue of Queen Maria Theresa of Austria in the gardens of Grassalkovich Palace.
- Equestrian statue of Saint George at the Saint George's Fountain, in the courtyard of the Primate's Palace.

Komárno

- Equestrian statue of King Stephen I of Hungary.

Štúrovo

- Equestrian statue of King John III Sobieski of Poland.

Žilina

- Equestrian statue of Jozef Miloslav Hurban in Žilina.
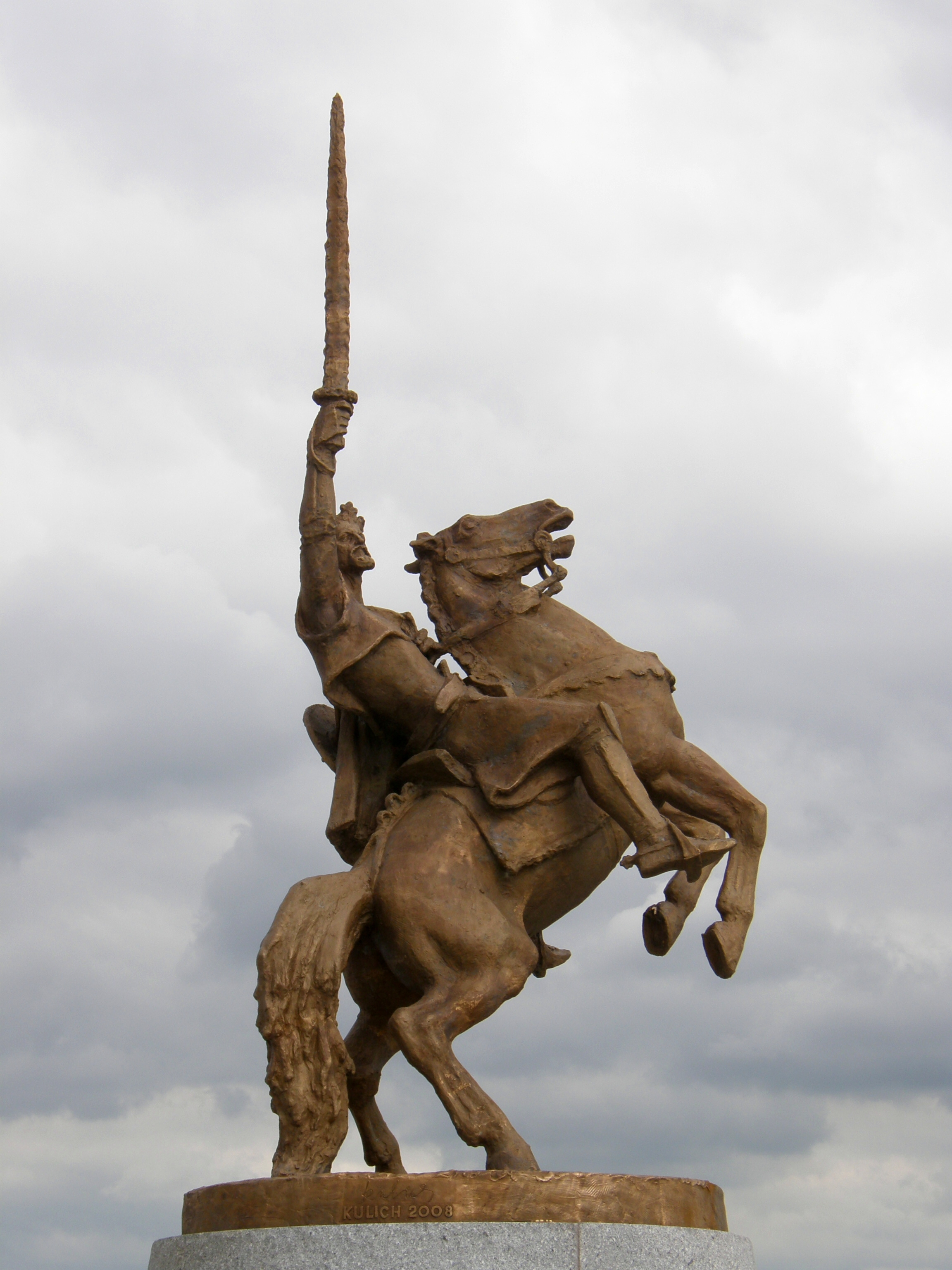
King Svätopluk I at Bratislava Castle

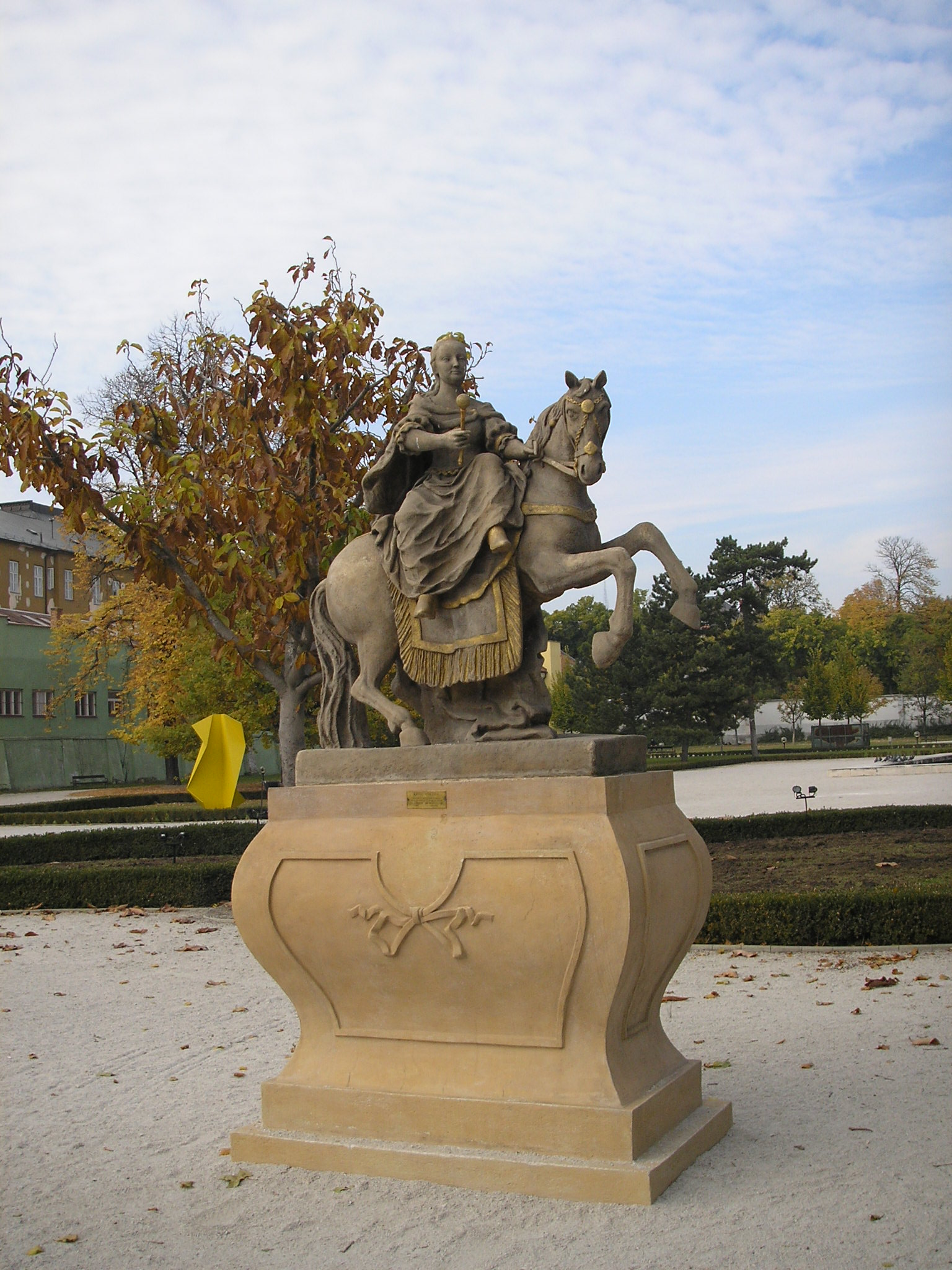
Queen Maria Theresa in Bratislava

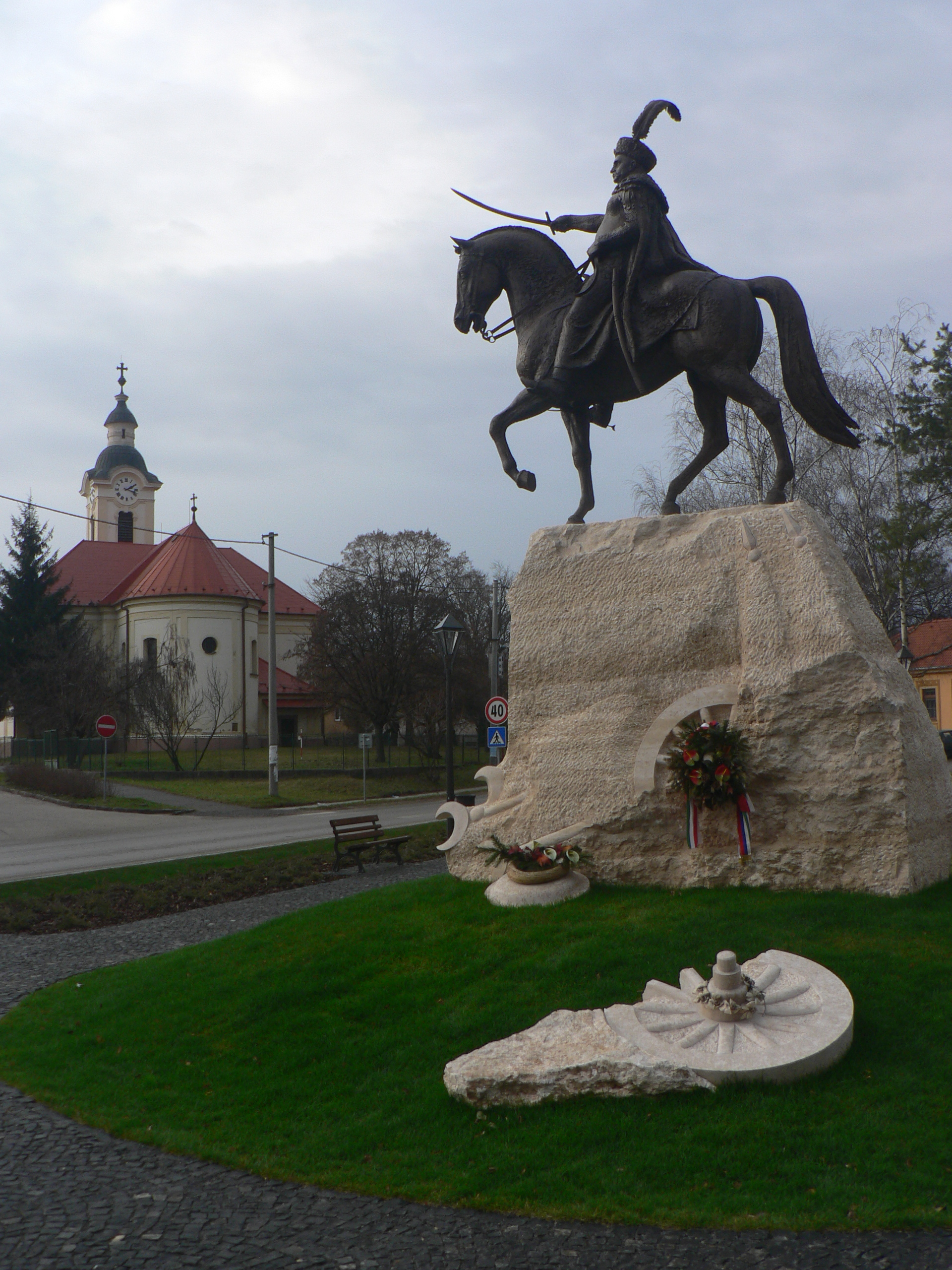
King John III Sobieski in Štúrovo

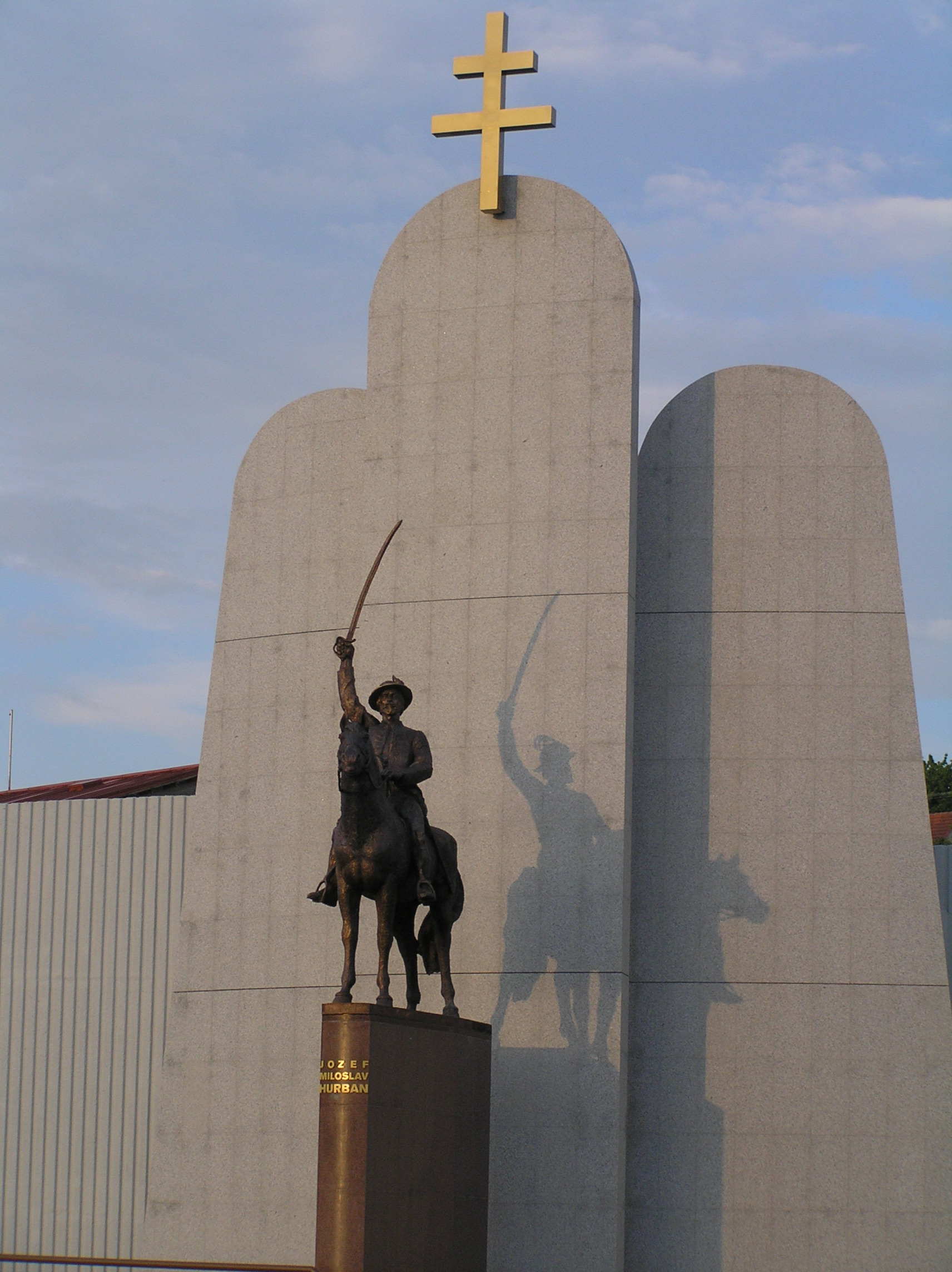
Jozef Miloslav Hurban in Žilina

== Slovenia ==
Ljubljana

- Rudolf Maister, Slovenian army general and poet, sculpture by Jakov Brdar. It stands in front of the Ljubljana railway station.

== South Africa ==
Cape Town

- Equestrian of Louis Botha in front of the parliament of South Africa.

Kimberley

- Equestrian of Cecil Rhodes

Pretoria

- Equestrian of Andries Pretorius.
- Equestrian of Louis Botha in front of the Union Buildings.

Port Elizabeth

- Horse Memorial (Tribute to the horses lost in the Second Boer War)
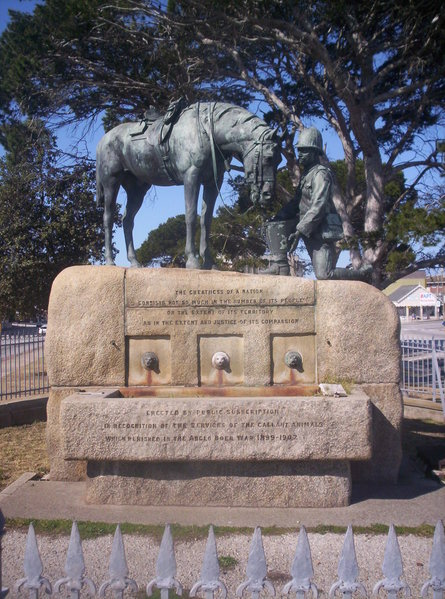
Horse Memorial in Port Elizabeth

== South Korea ==
- Equestrian statue of Kim Yu-sin in Gyeongju National Park.
- Equestrian statue of Kang Kam-ch'an in Nakseongdae Park.
- Equestrian statue of Gwak Jaeu in Mangu Park in Daegu.
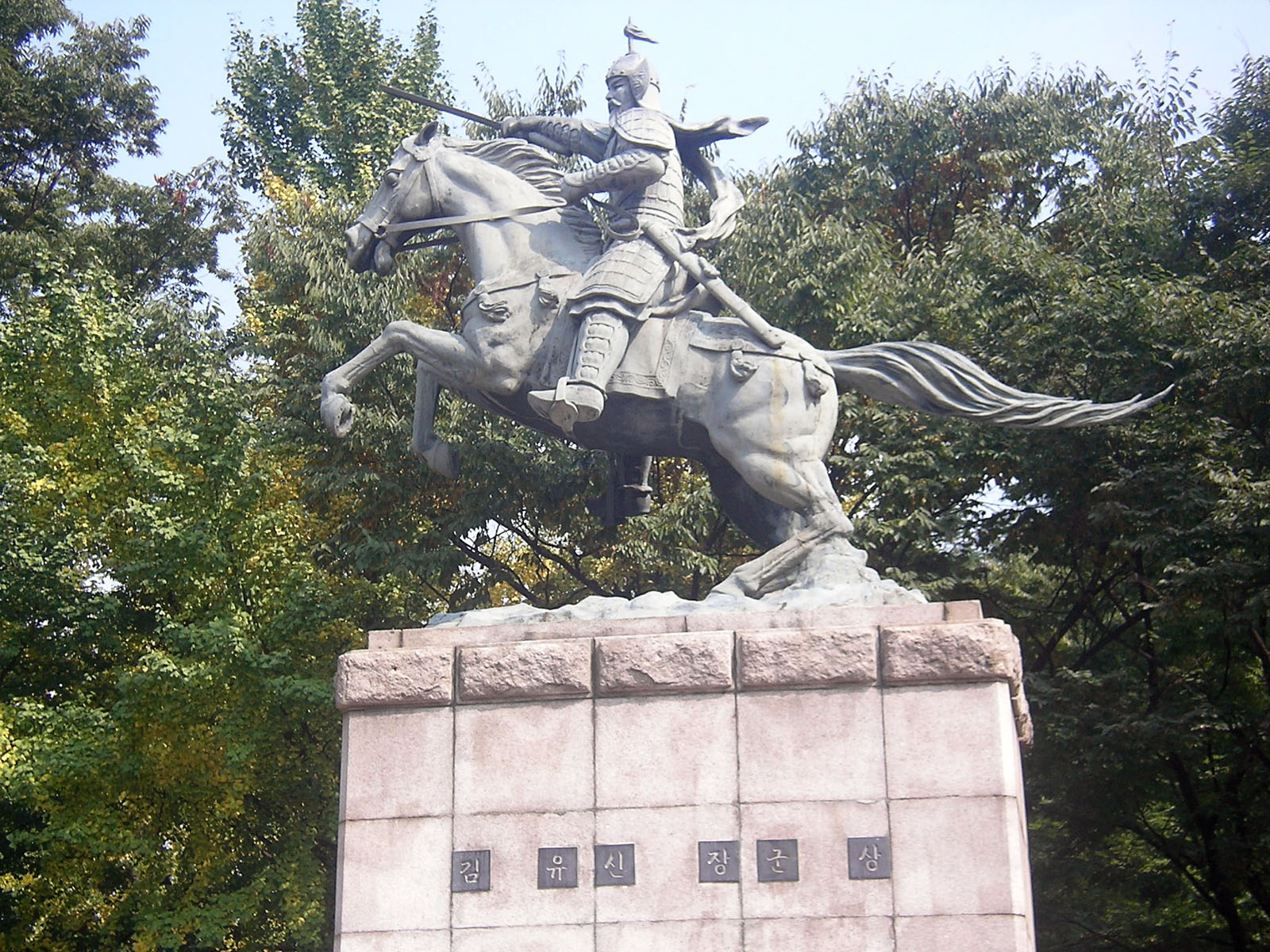
Kim Yu-sin in Gyeongju

== Sri Lanka ==
- Sangiliyan Statue, Equestrian of Cankili II of Jaffna.

== Sudan ==
Khartoum

- Equestrian of Field Marshal Kitchener.
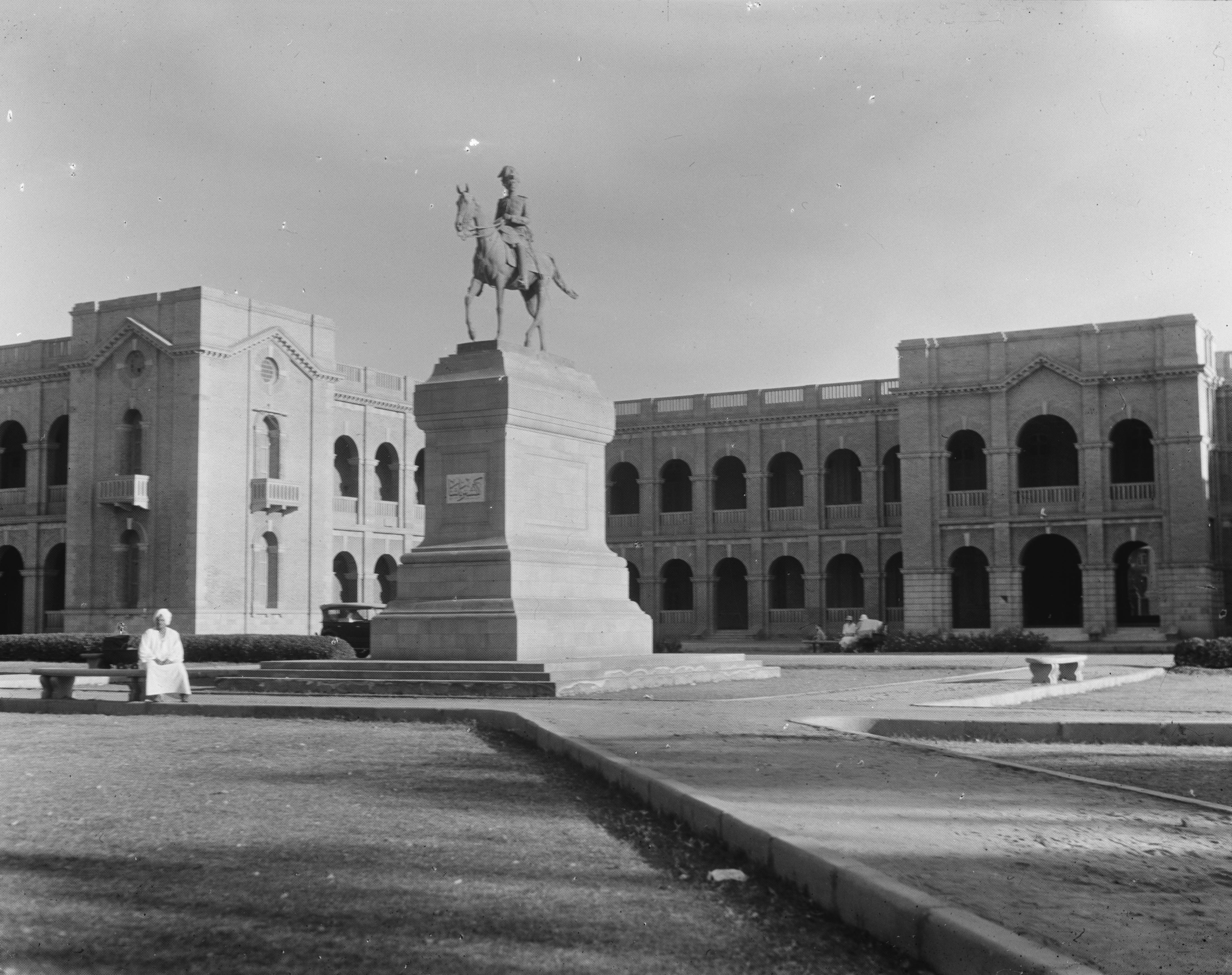
Field Marshal Kitchener in Khartoum

== Sweden ==
Stockholm

- Saint George and Dragon by Bernt Notke, Gamla Stan.
- Saint George slaying the dragon in Storkyrkan.
- Equestrian of Karl XIV Johan by Bengt Erland Fogelberg located at Slussplan on Gamla Stan.
- Equestrian statue of Gustavus Adolphus at Gustav Adolfs torg.
- Equestrian of Karl X Gustav in front of Nordic Museum at Djurgården.
- Equestrian of Karl XV in front of Biological Museum at Djurgården.
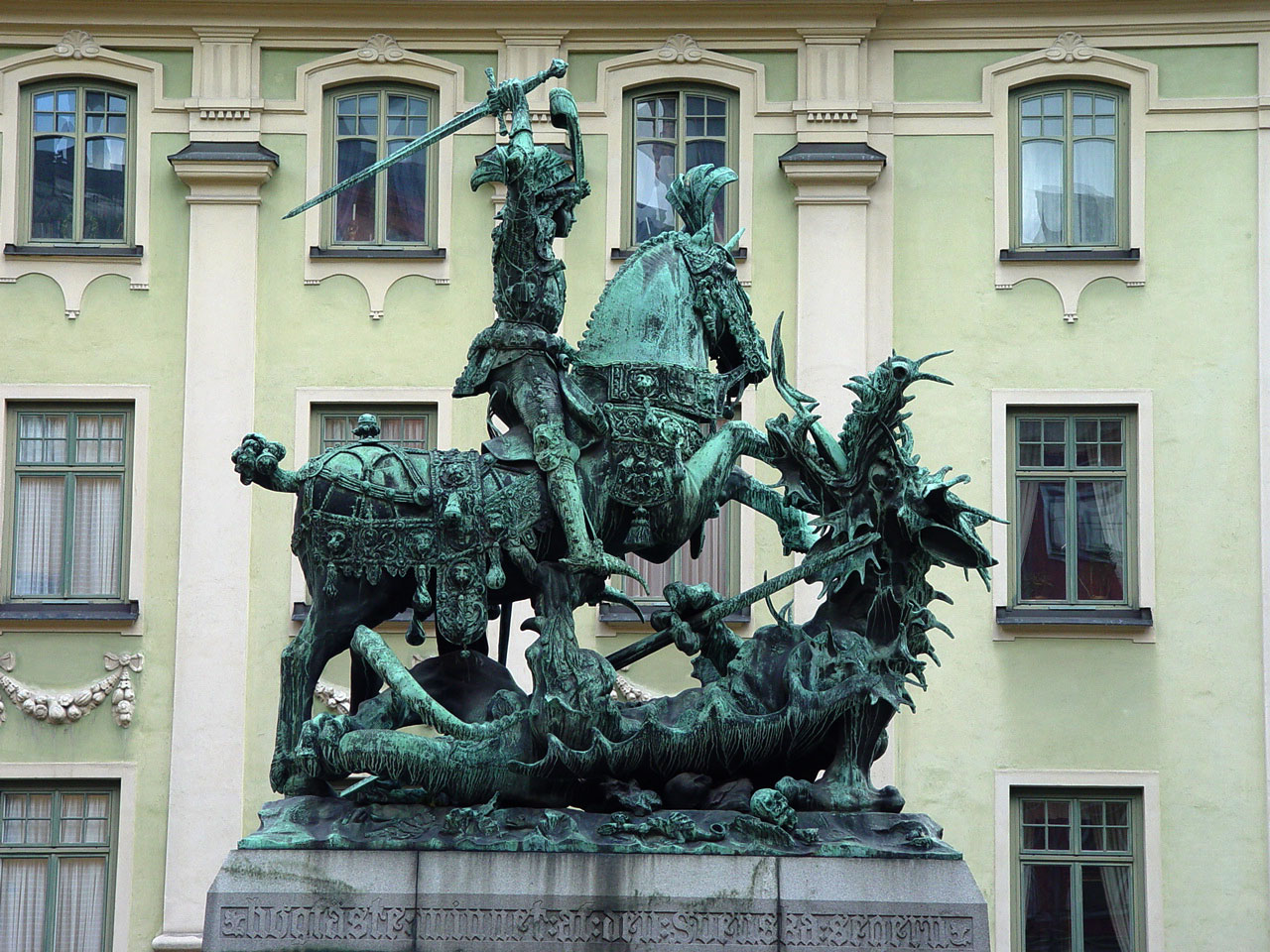
Saint George and Dragon in Stockholm

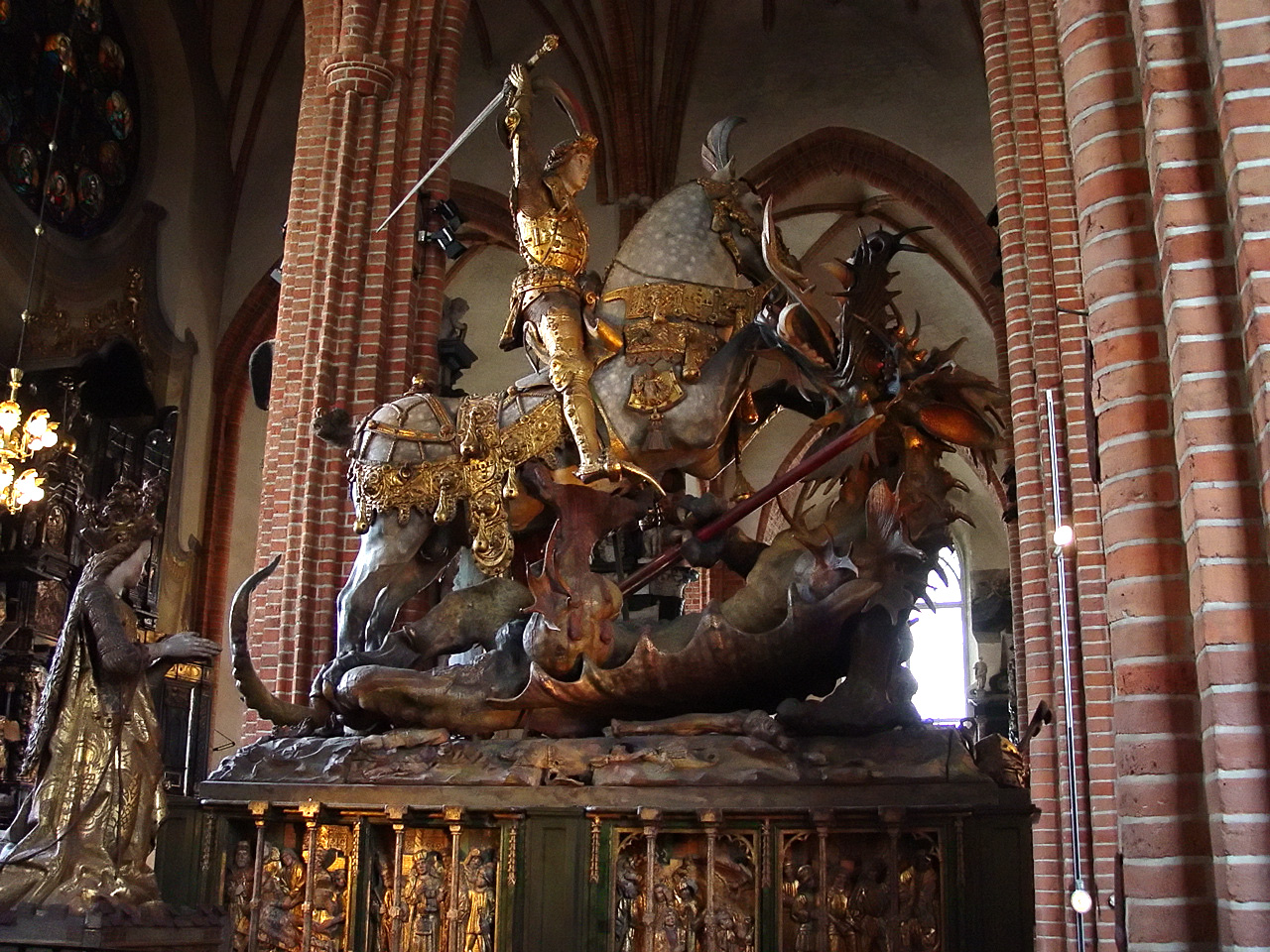
Saint George in the Storkyrkan, Stockholm

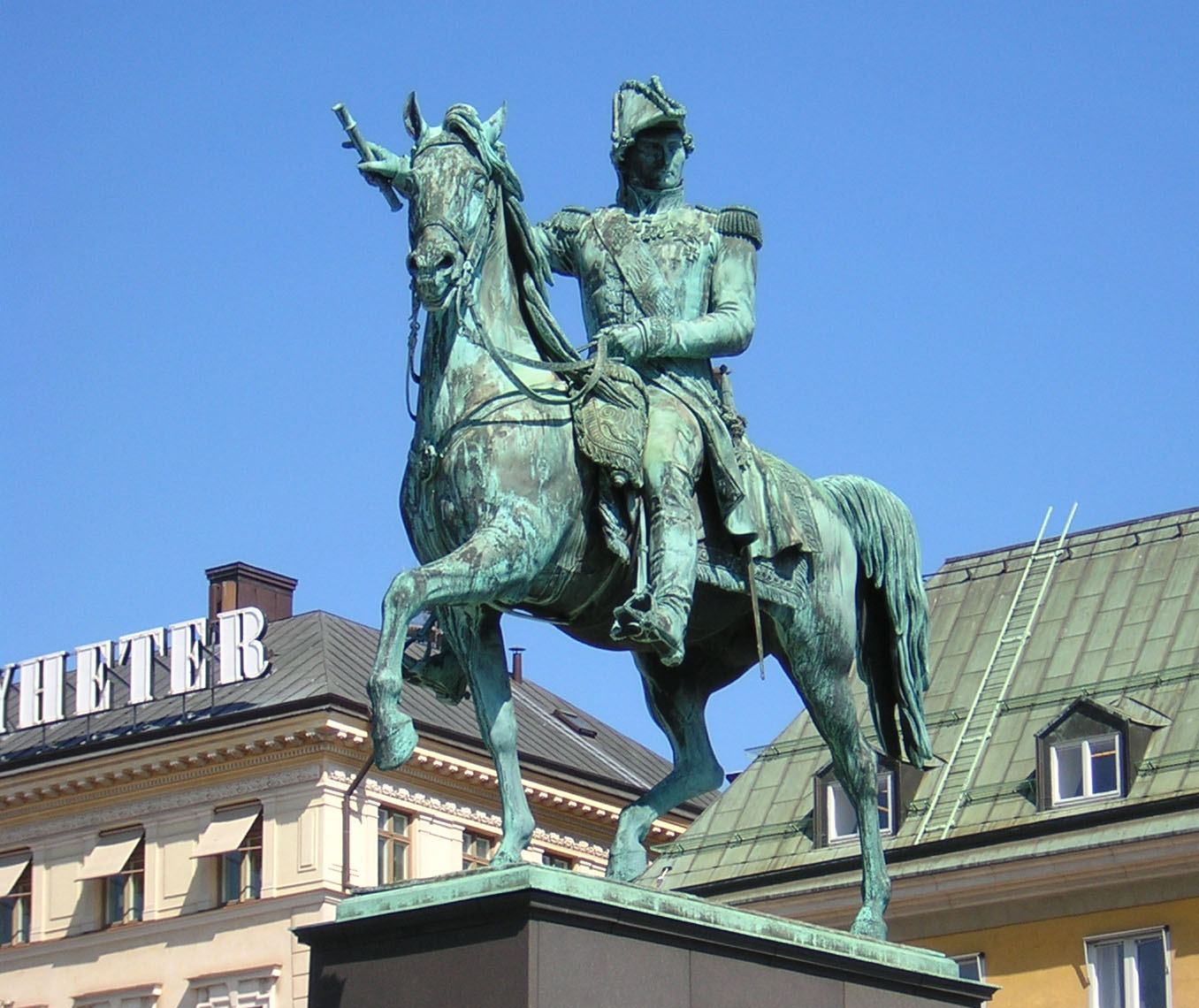
Karl XIV Johan in Stockholm

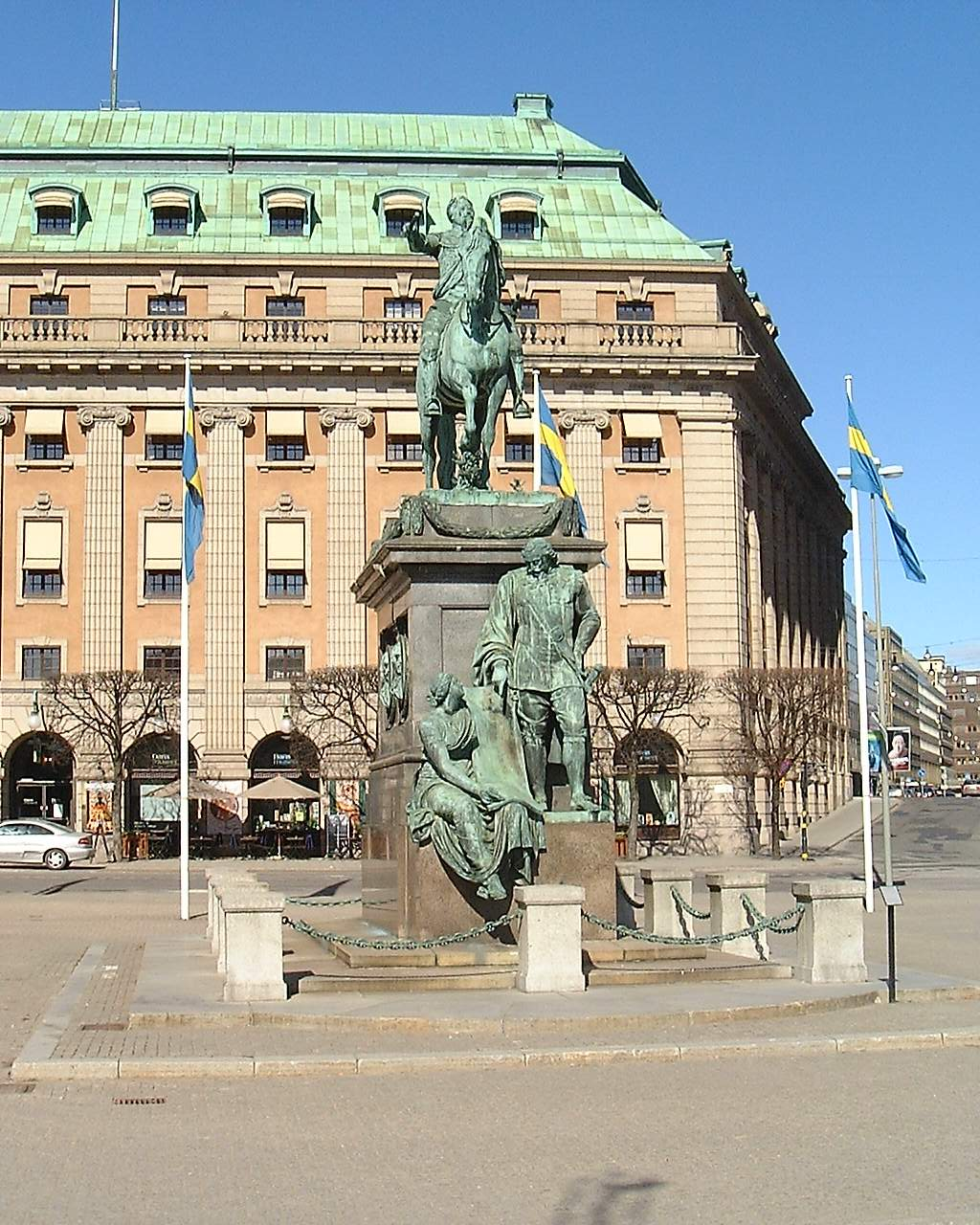
Gustavus Adolphus in Stockholm

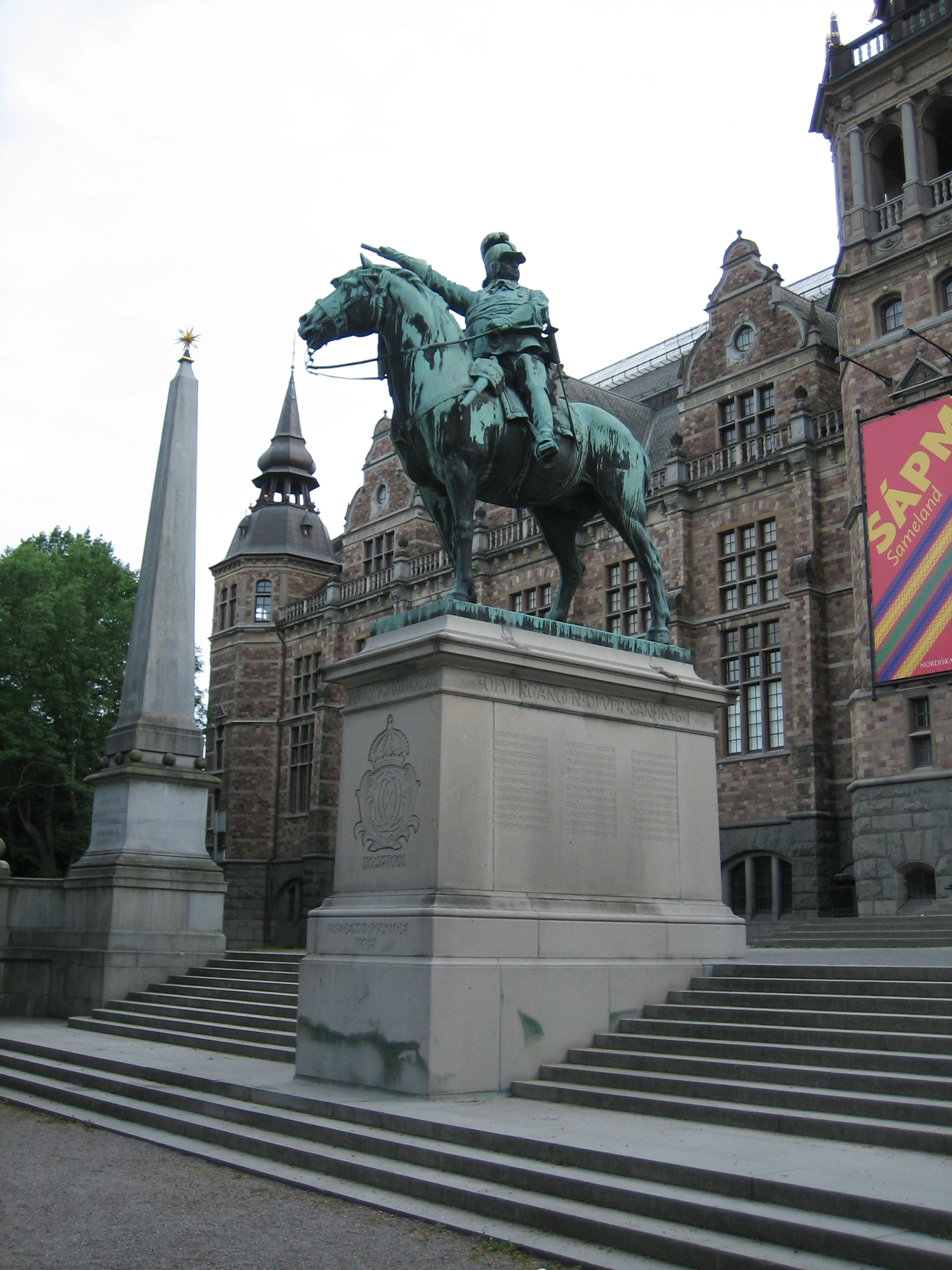
Karl X Gustav in Stockholm

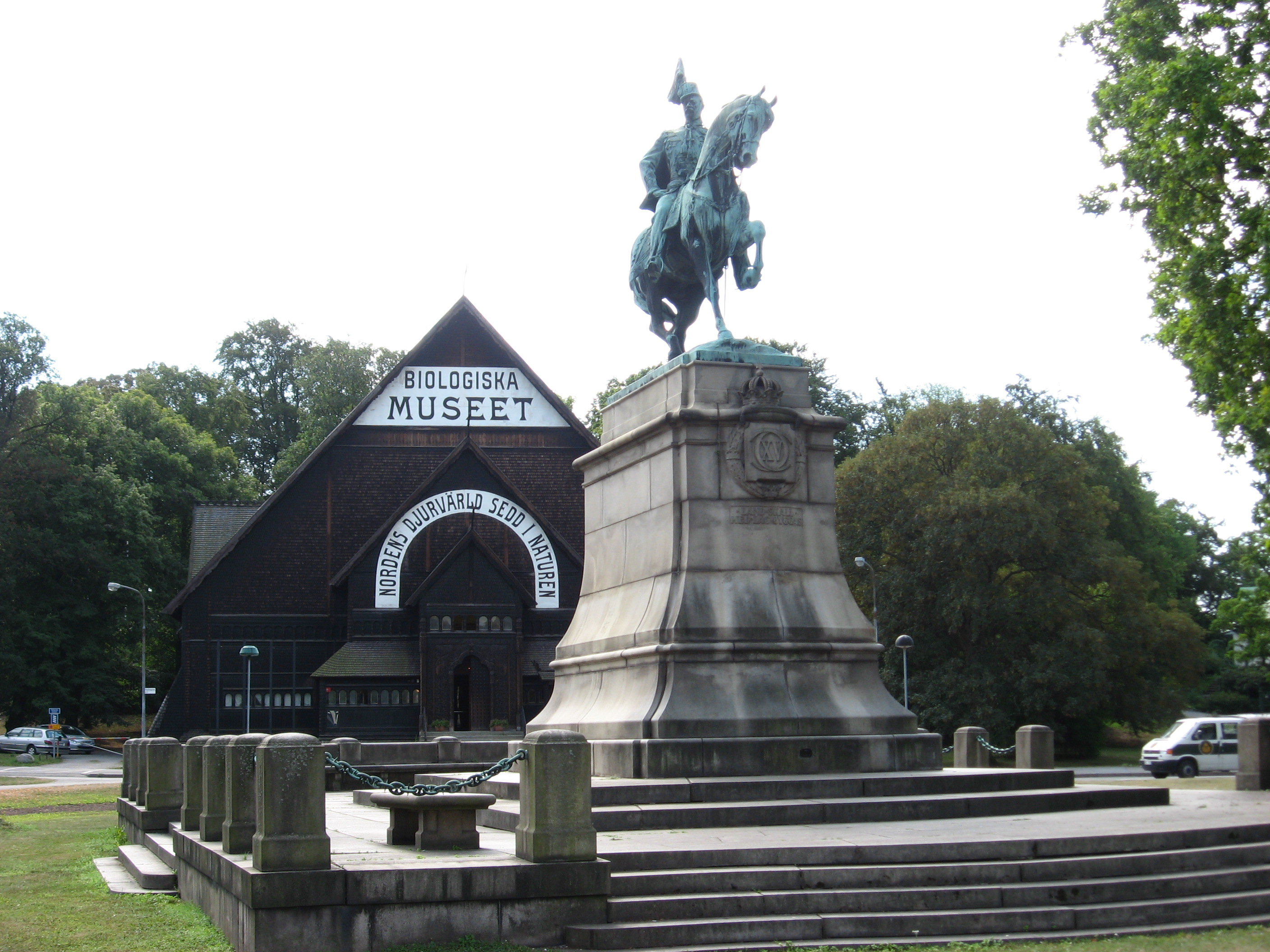
Karl XV in Stockholm

Gothenburg

- Equestrian called Kopparmärra of Karl IX, standing at Kungsportsplaten.

Helsingborg

- Equestrian of field marshal Magnus Stenbock, standing at Stortorget.

Linköping

- Folkungabrunnen, equestrian of Folke Filbyter searching for his grandchild, statue by Carl Milles.

Malmö

- Equestrian of Karl X Gustav, standing at Stortorget.

Vänersborg

- Equestrian of Saint Martin by Carl Milles, 1951.
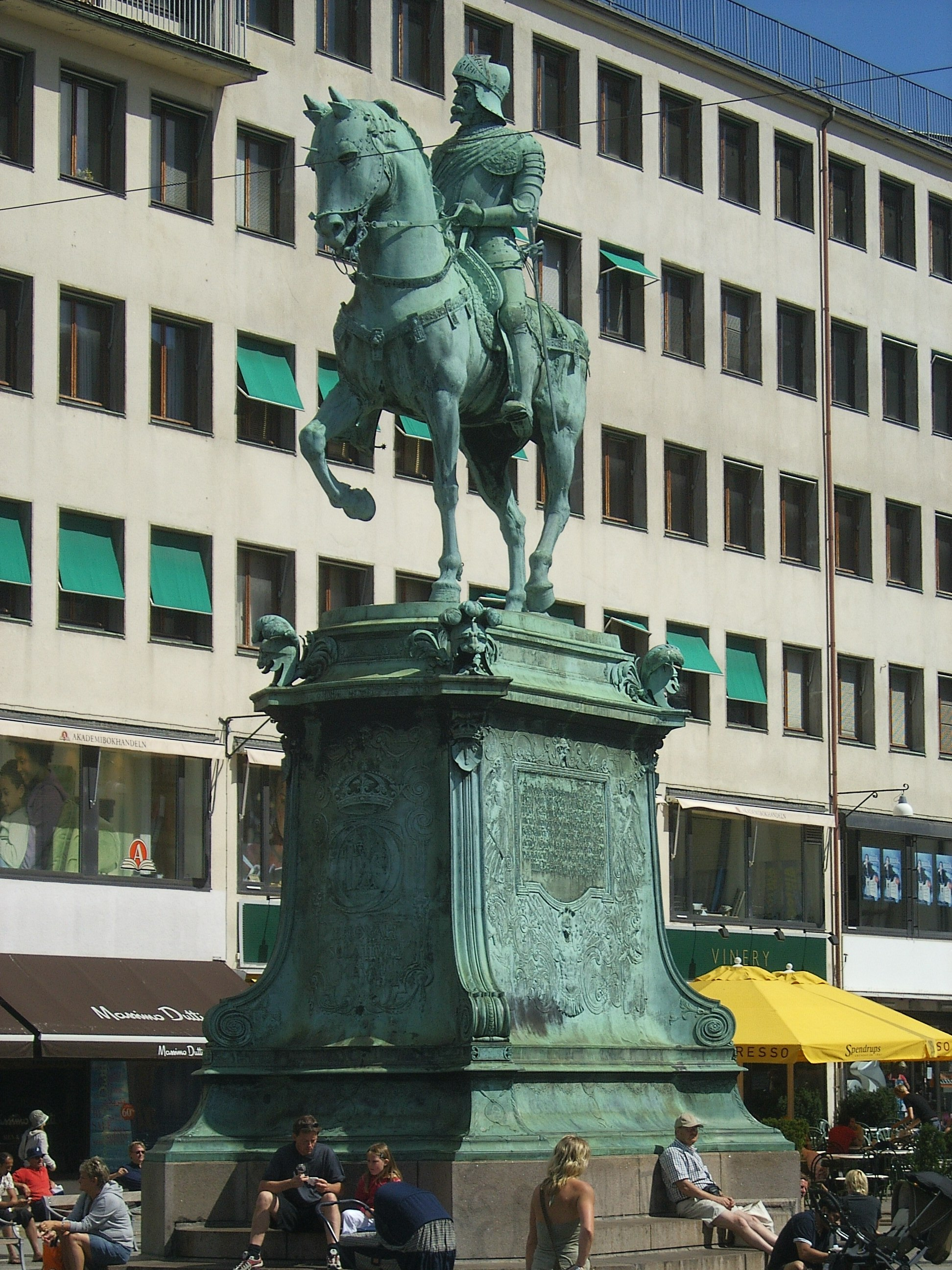
Karl IX in Gothenburg

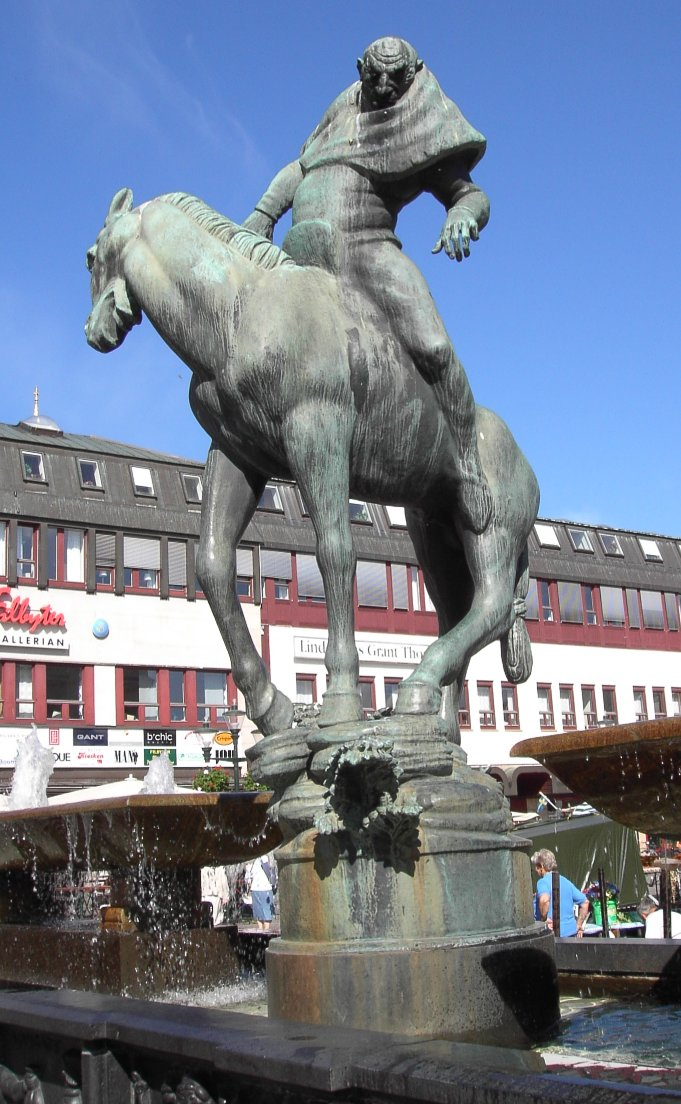
Folkungabrunnen with Folke Filbyter in Linköping

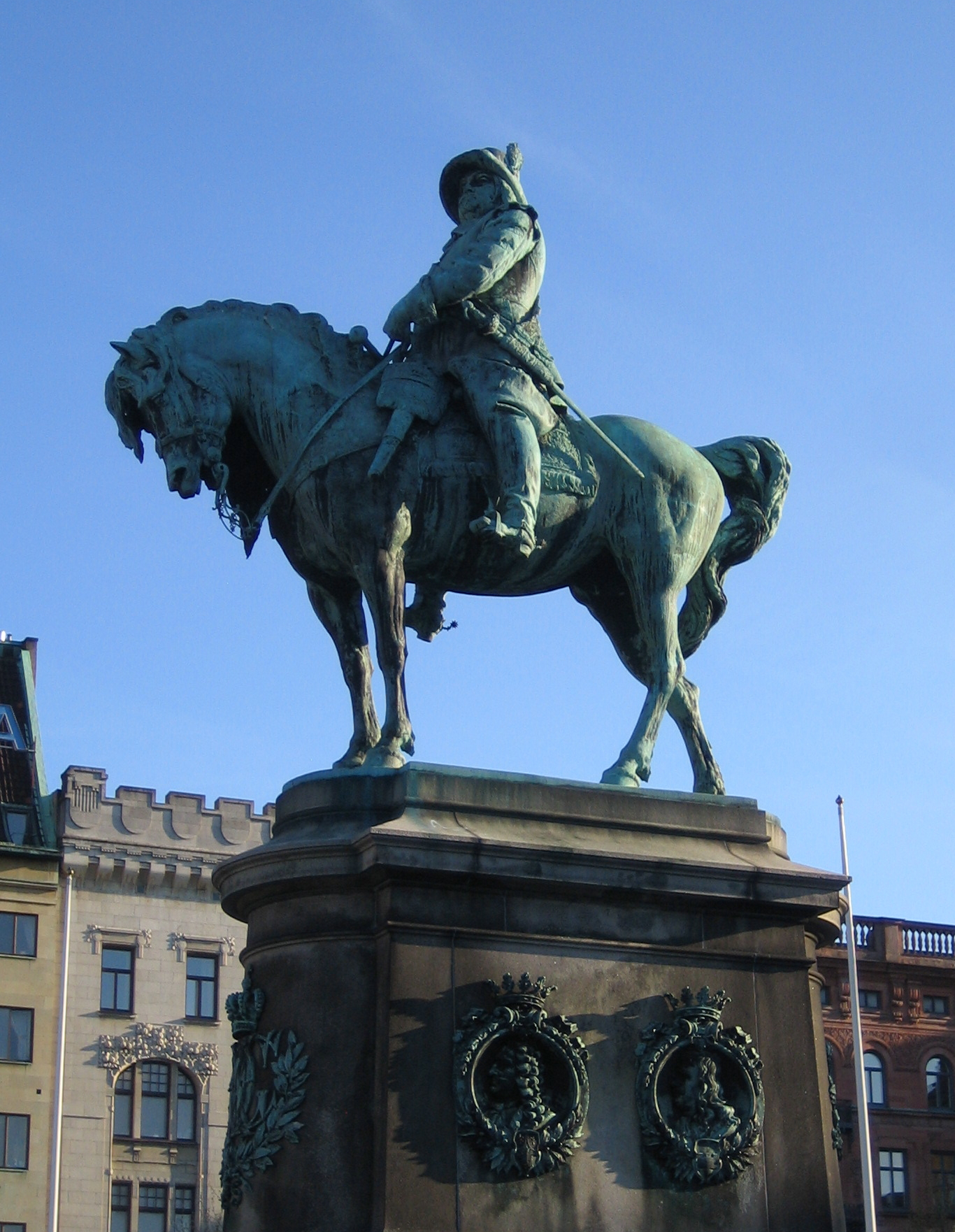
Karl X Gustav in Malmö

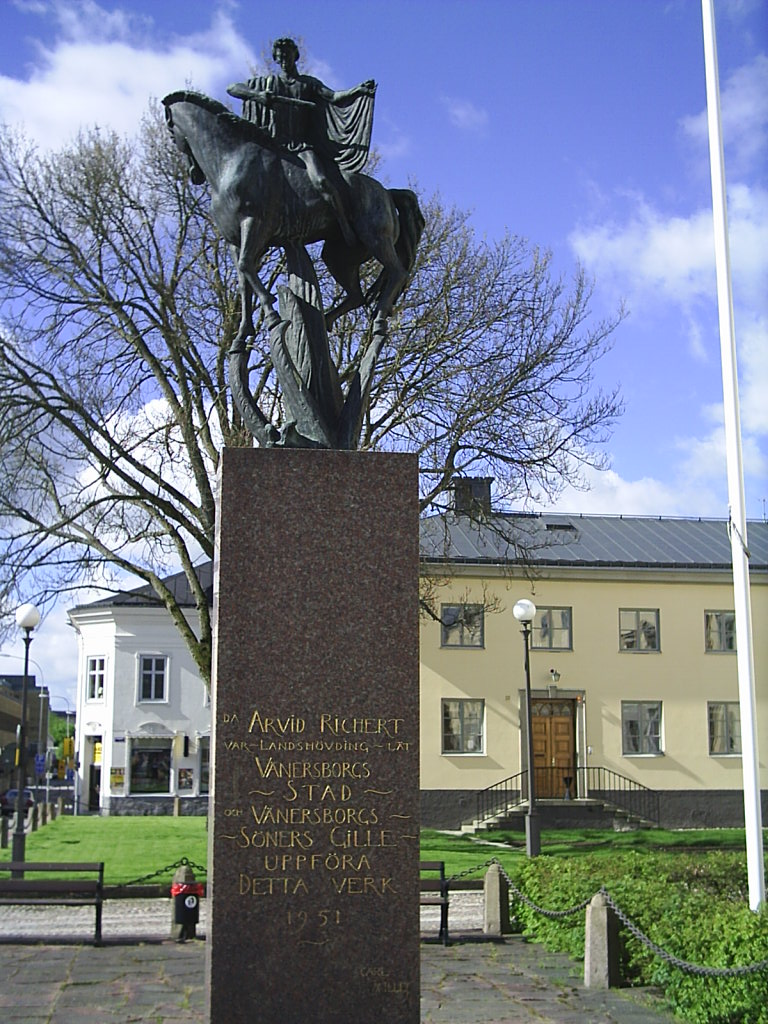
Saint Martin in Vänersborg

== Switzerland ==
Basel

- Saint Martin of Tours (316–397), 19th century copy, at Basel Minster.
- Saint Martin of Tours (316–397) original statue, after 1343, in Museum Kleines Klingental.
- Saint George (c.275/281–303), copy, at Basel Minster.
- Saint George (c.275/281–303) original statue, after 1372, in Museum Kleines Klingental.

Bern

- Rudolf von Erlach (1299–1360) by Joseph Simon Volmar and Urs Bargetzi, 1849, at Grabenpromenade since 1969.
- Henri Guisan (1874–1960) by Laurent Boillat, 1949, at Library am Guisanplatz.

Elm

- Monument to Alexander Suvorov (c. 1729–1800)

Fribourg

- Berthold IV, Duke of Zähringen (1125–1186) by Antoine Claraz, 1965, at Derrière-les-Remparts 9.

Geneva

- Monument to General Dufour (1787–1875) by Karl Alfred Lanz, 1884, on Place Neuve.
- Charles II, Duke of Brunswick (1804–1873) equestrian bronze by Auguste Cain, 1879, part of Brunswick Monument.
- Colombe de la Paix and Aigle de Genève: two equestrian sculptures with a female and a male rider by Frédéric Schmied, 1939, at Quai Turrettini.

Lausanne

- Equestrian statue of Henri Guisan (1874–1960) by Otto Bänninger, 1967, at Ouchy.

Ligornetto

- Charles II, Duke of Brunswick, plaster by Vincenzo Vela, 1874–1876, in Museo Vincenzo Vela.

Muralto

- Saint Victor Maurus (San Vittore Il Moro) relief by Martino Benzonis, 1460–1462, on the church tower of the Collegiata di San Vittore

St. Gallen

- Martin of Tours (316–397) by Josef Büsser, 1936, at St. Martin Bruggen church.

St. Gotthard Pass

- Monument to Alexander Suvorov (c. 1729–1800) by Dmitry Tougarinov, 1999.

Zürich

- Statue of Hans Waldmann (1435–1489) by Hermann Haller, 1937, at Münsterbrücke respectively Münsterhof and Stadthausquai.
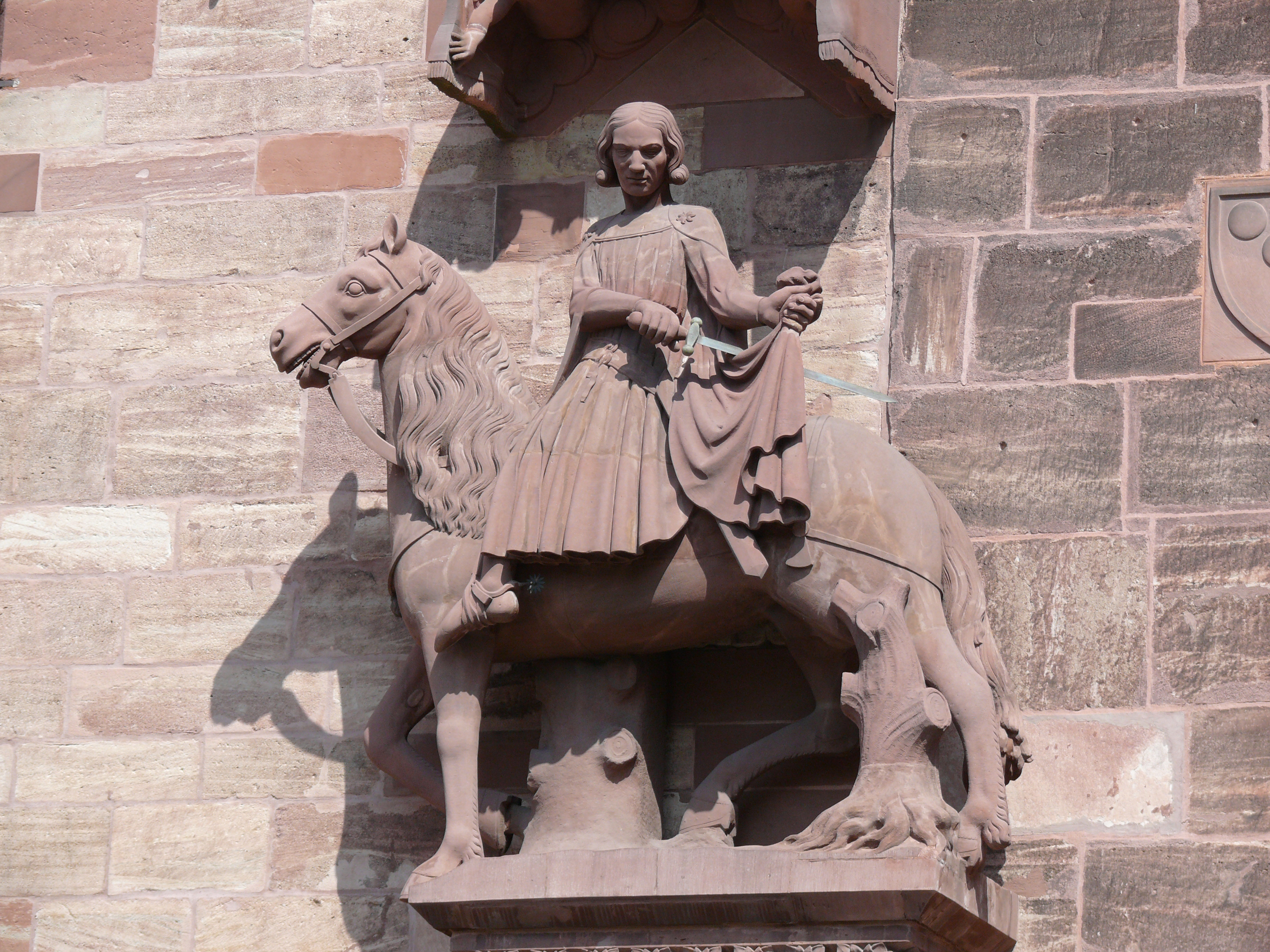
Martin of Tours in Basel

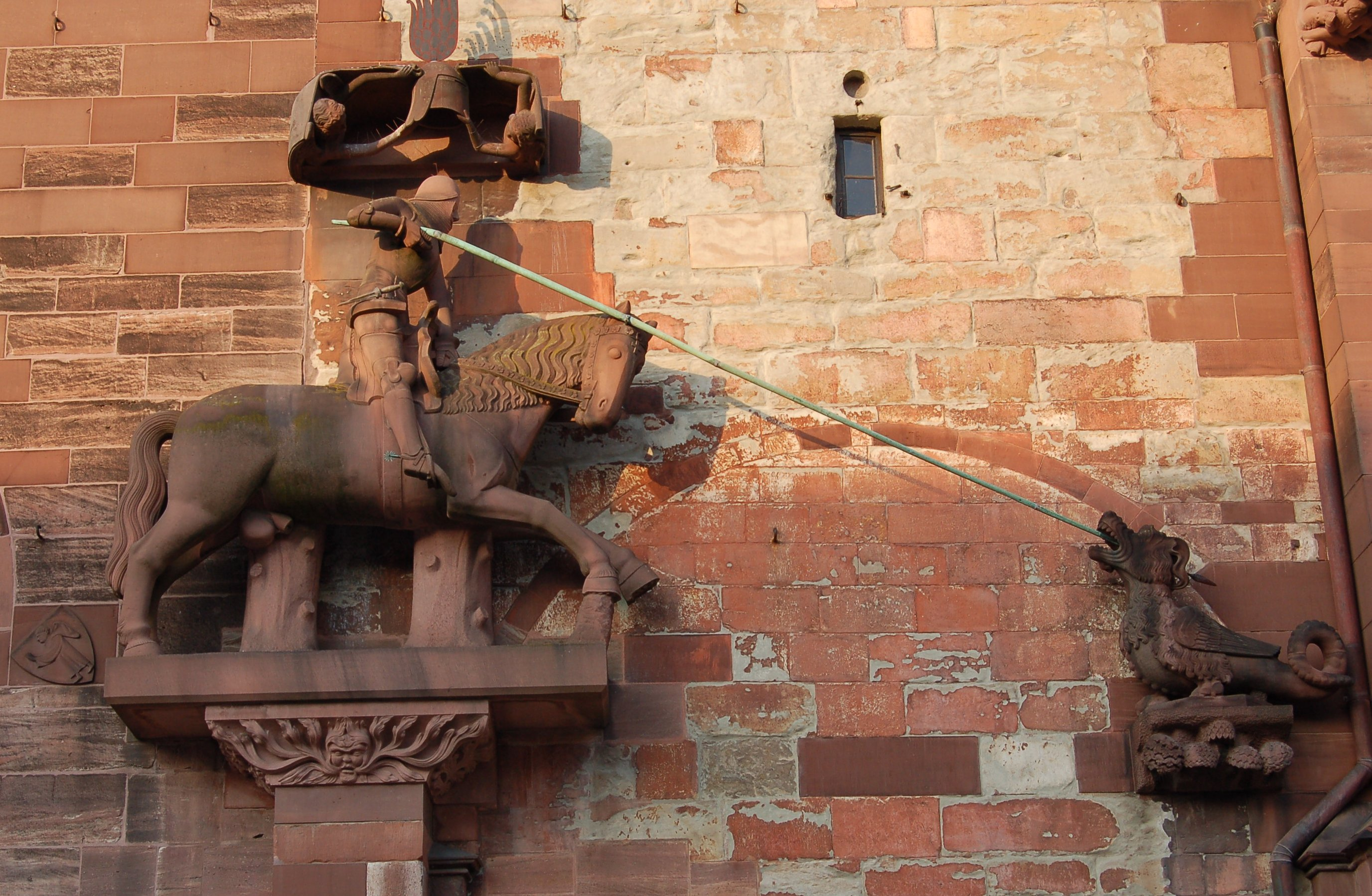
Saint George in Basel

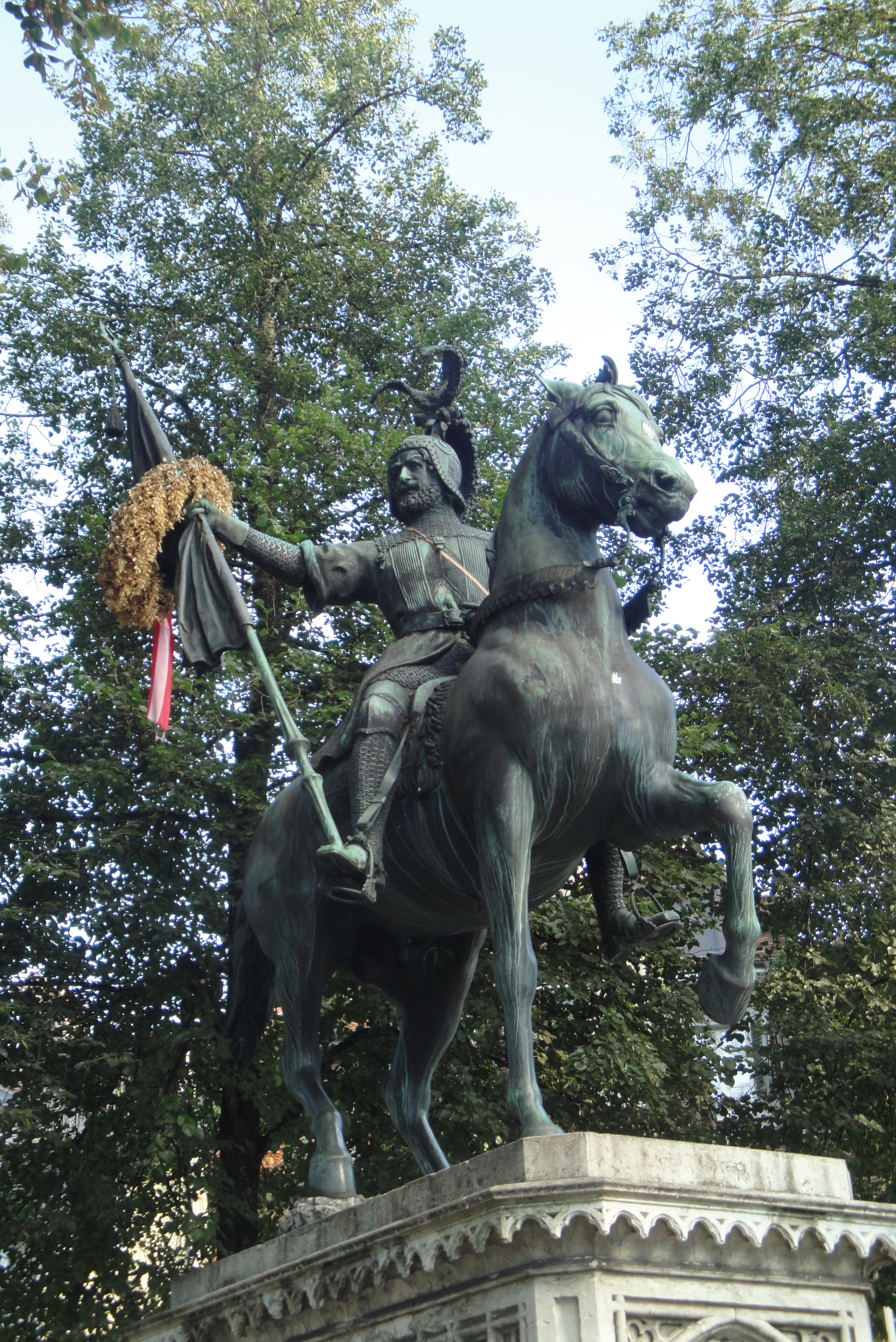
Rudolf von Erlach in Bern

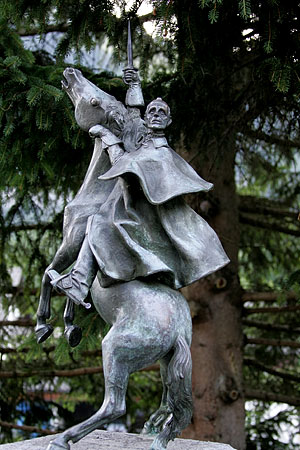
Alexander Suvorov in Elm

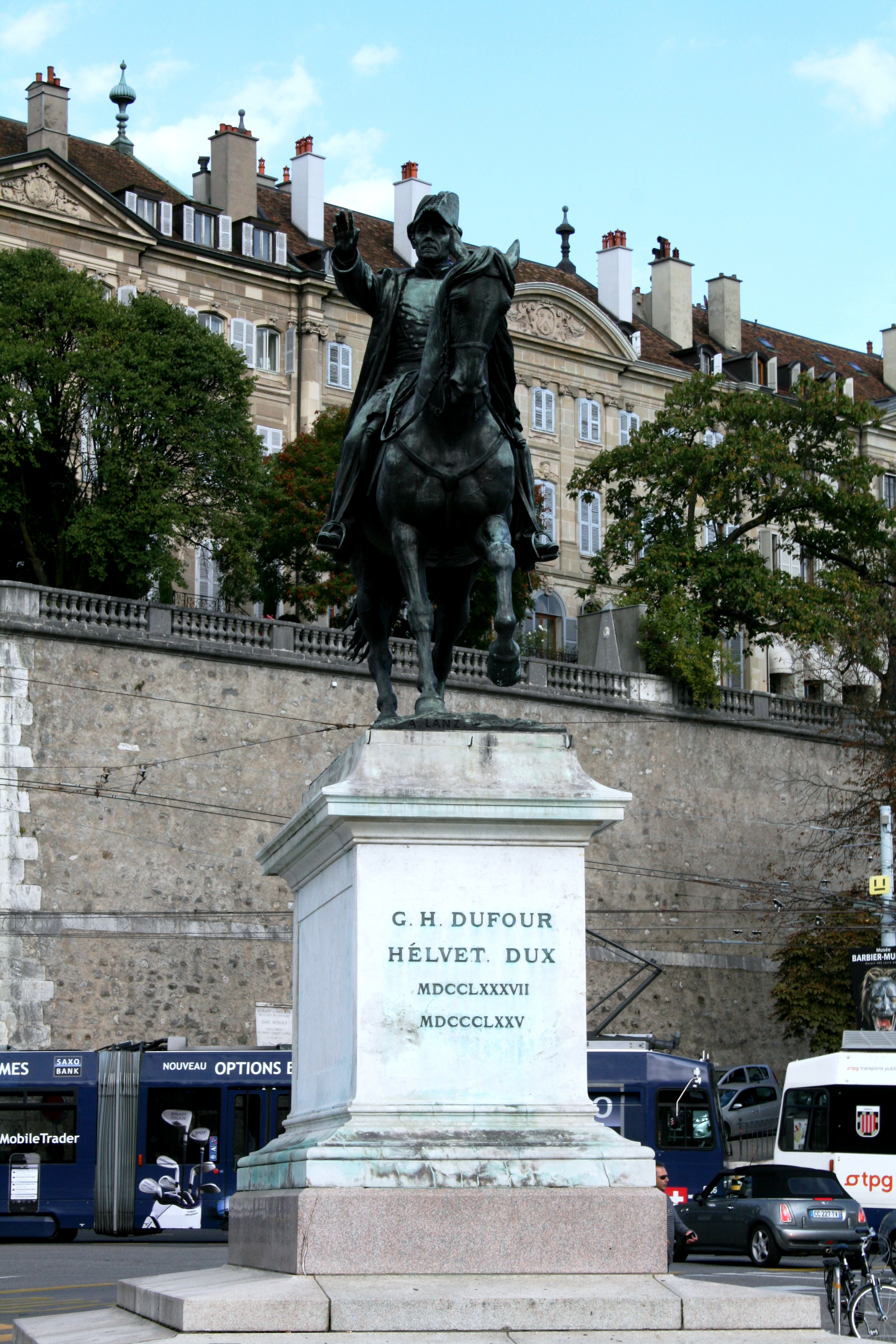
General Dufour in Geneva

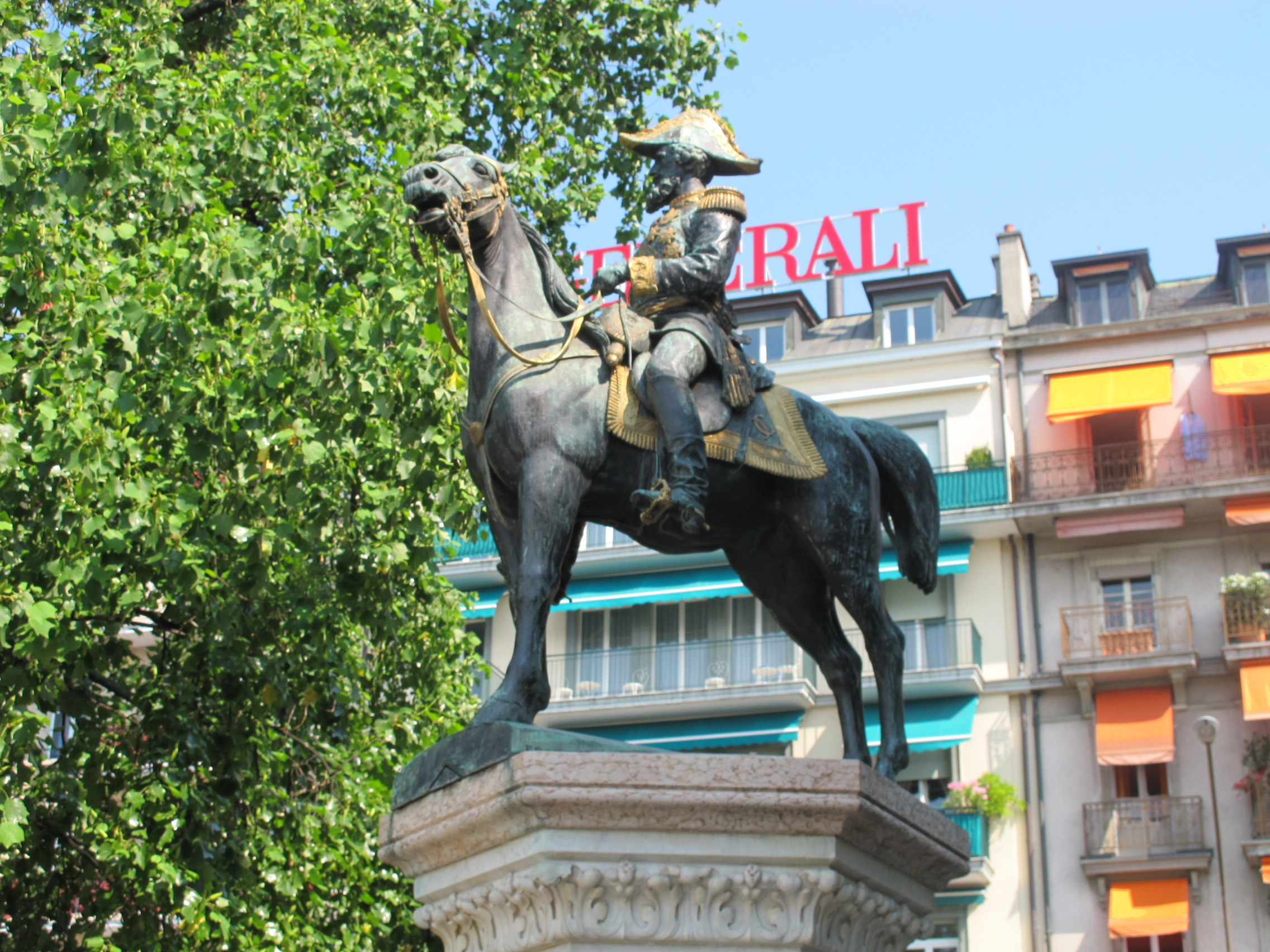
Charles II, Duke of Brunswick in Geneva

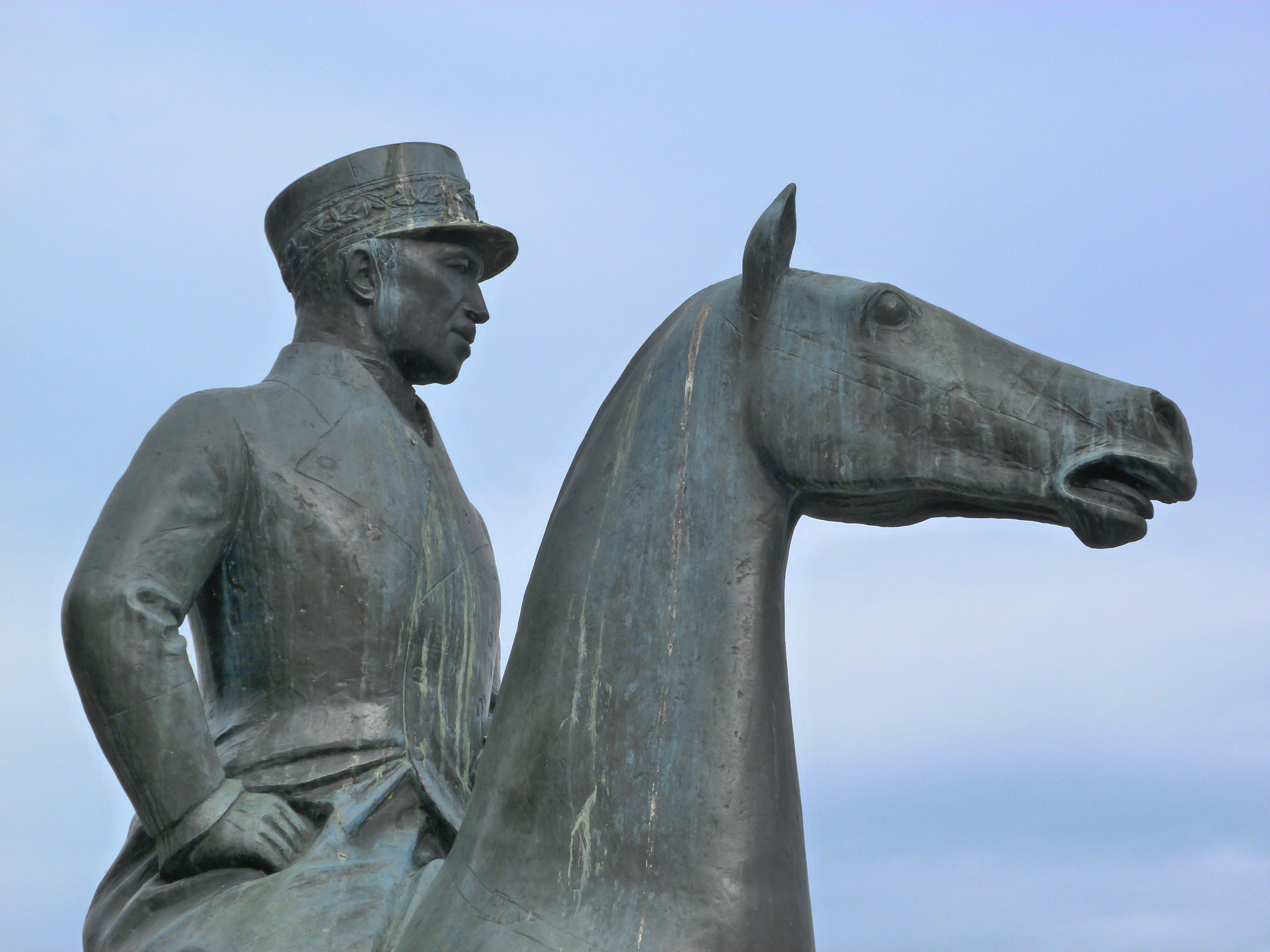
Henri Guisan in Lausanne

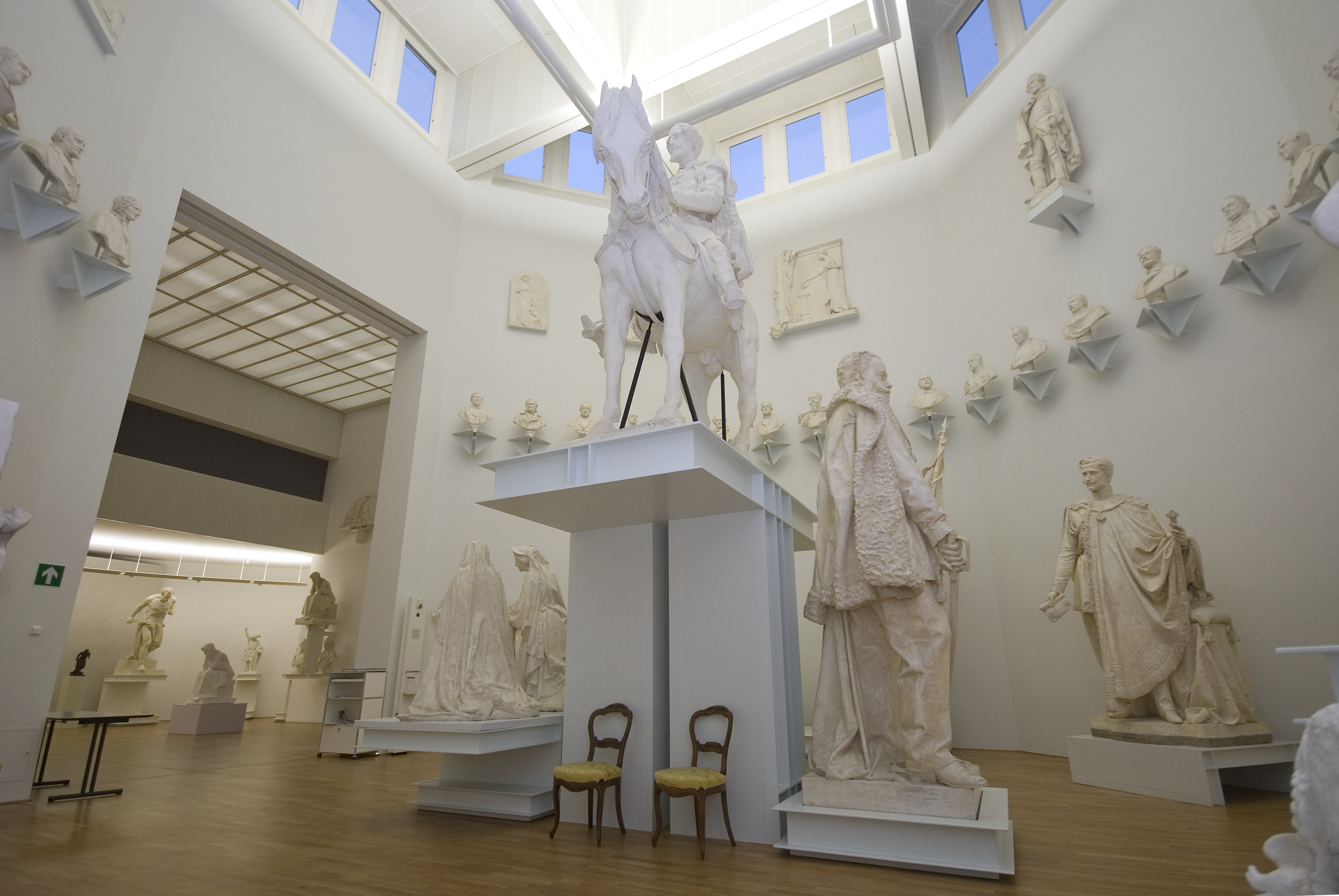
Duke of Brunswick in Museo Vela, Ligornetto

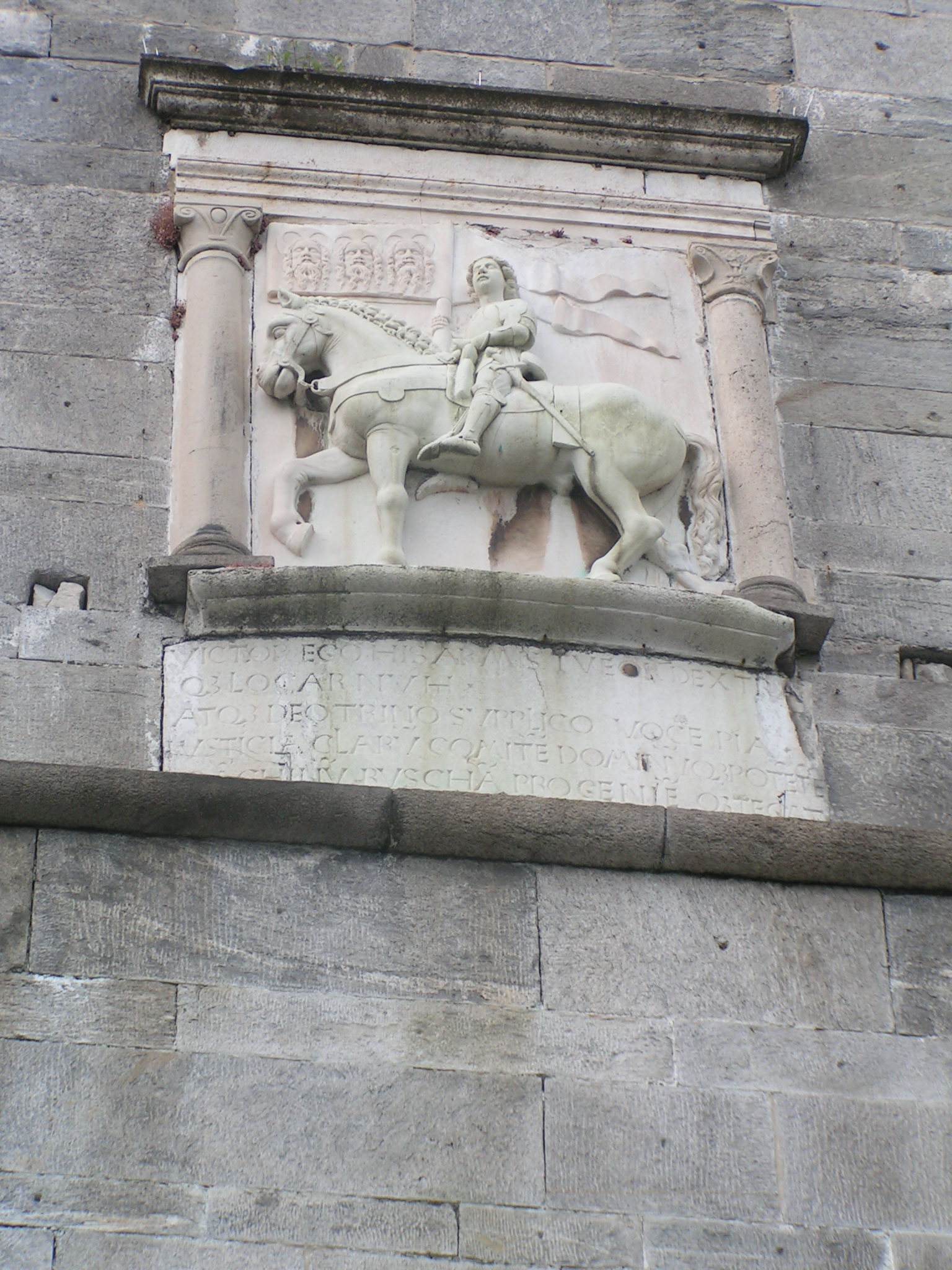
Saint Victor Maurus (San Vittore Il Moro) at Muralto

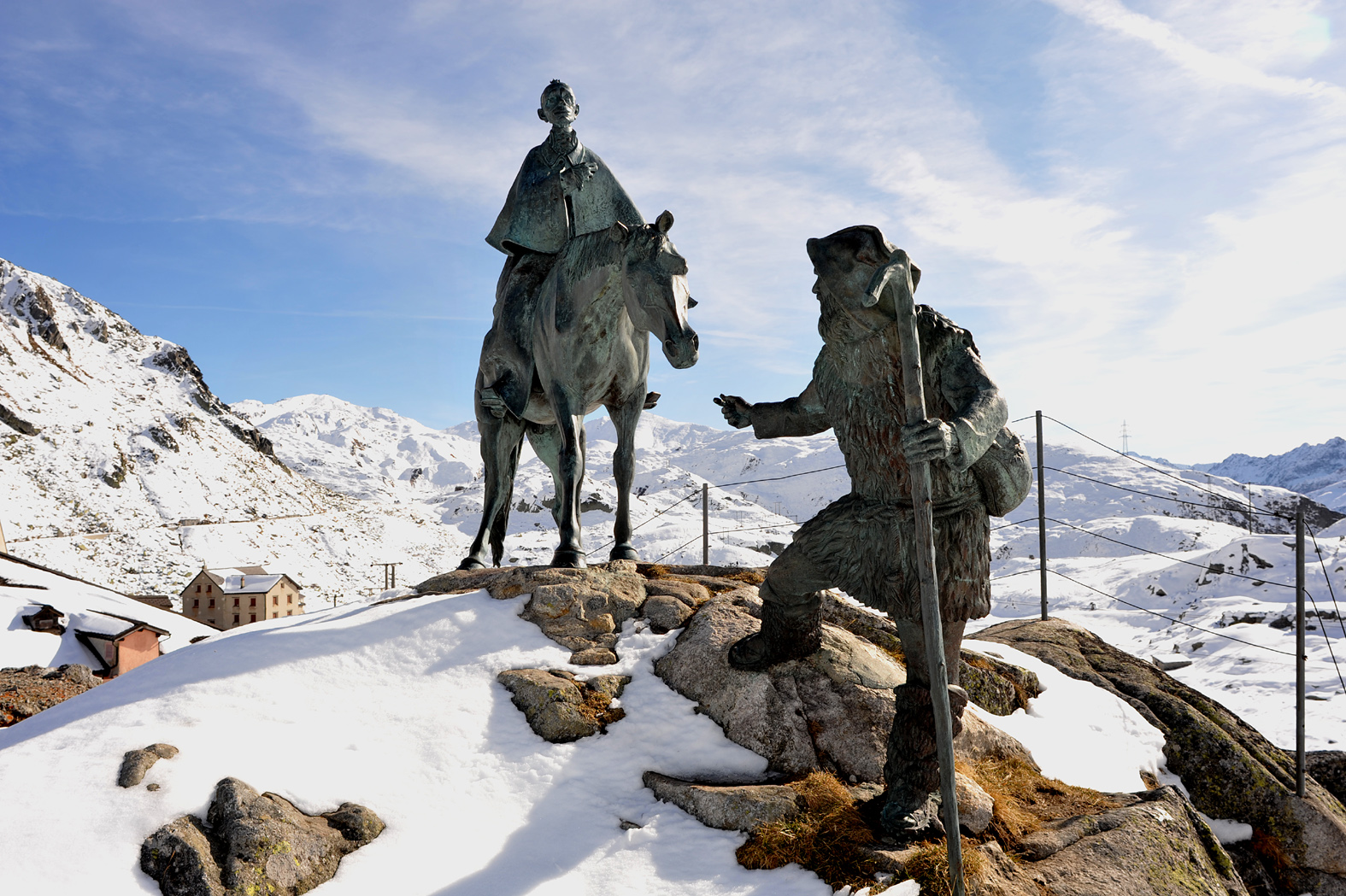
Alexander Suvorov on the St. Gotthard Pass

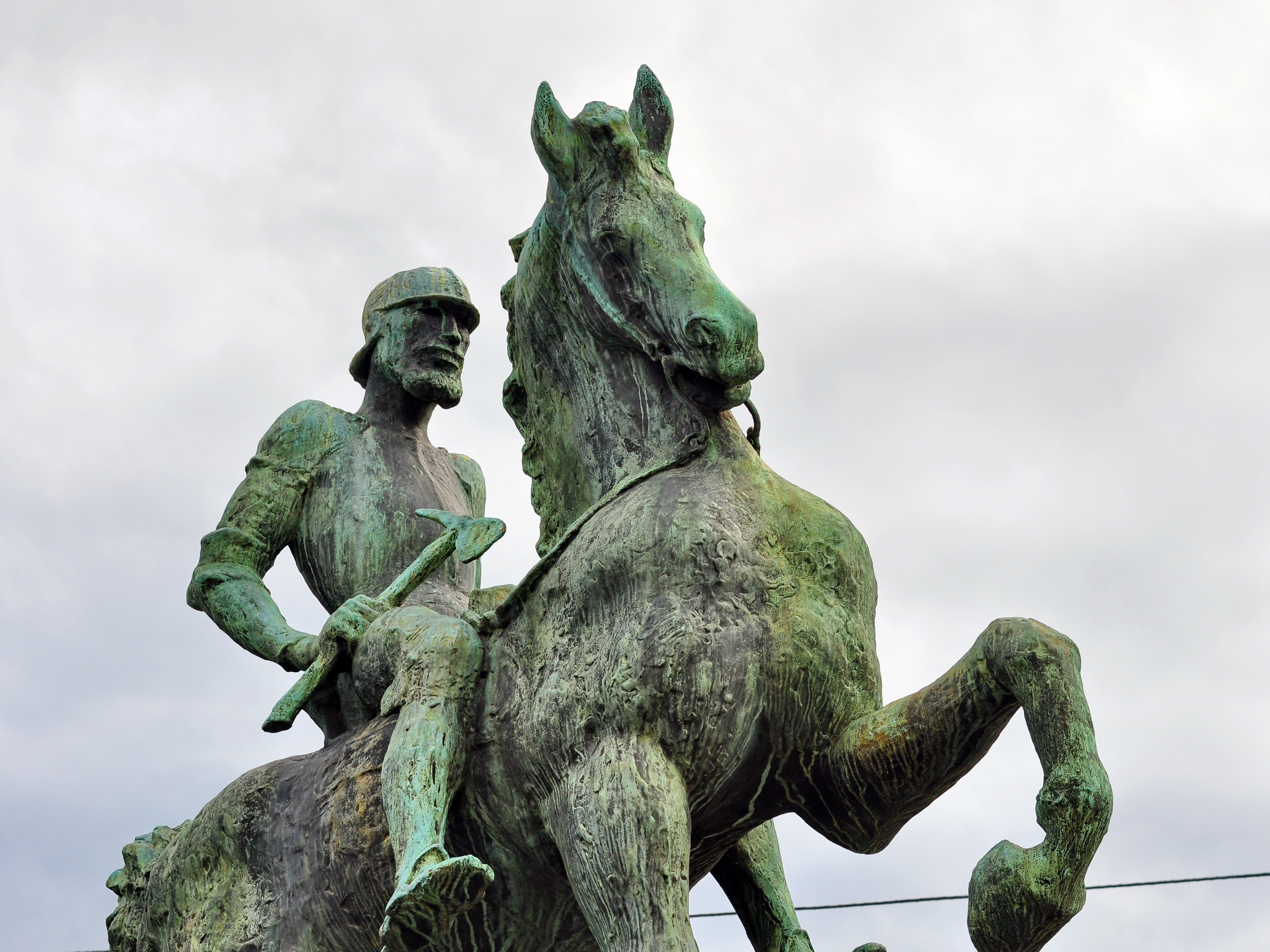
Hans Waldmann in Zürich

== Syria ==
Aleppo

- Equestrian statue of Bassel al-Assad.

Damascus

- Monument of Sultan of Egypt and Syria Saladin.
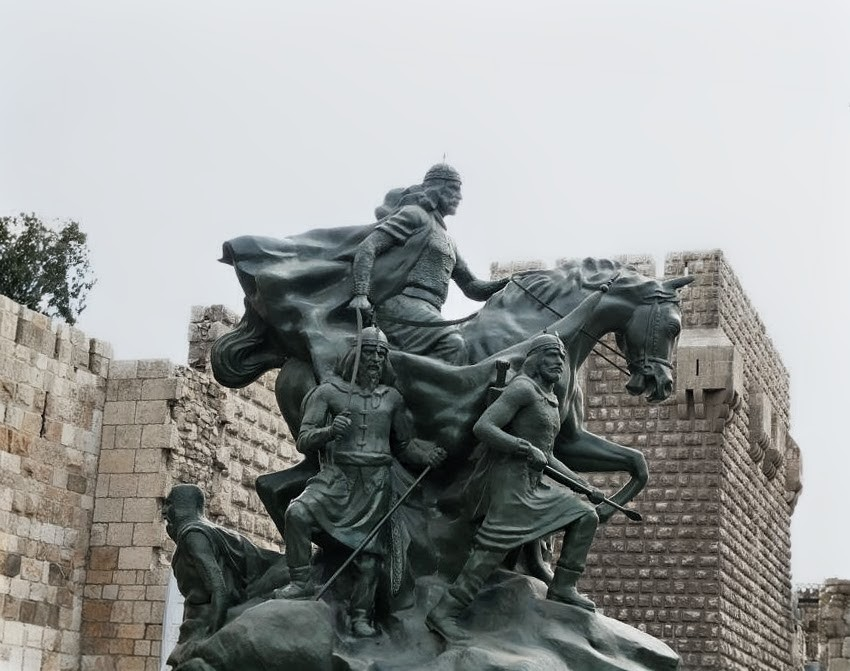
Statue of Saladin in front of the Citadel of Damascus

== Thailand ==
Bangkok

- Equestrian of King Rama V at the Royal Plaza.
- Equestrian of King Taksin at Wongwian Yai.
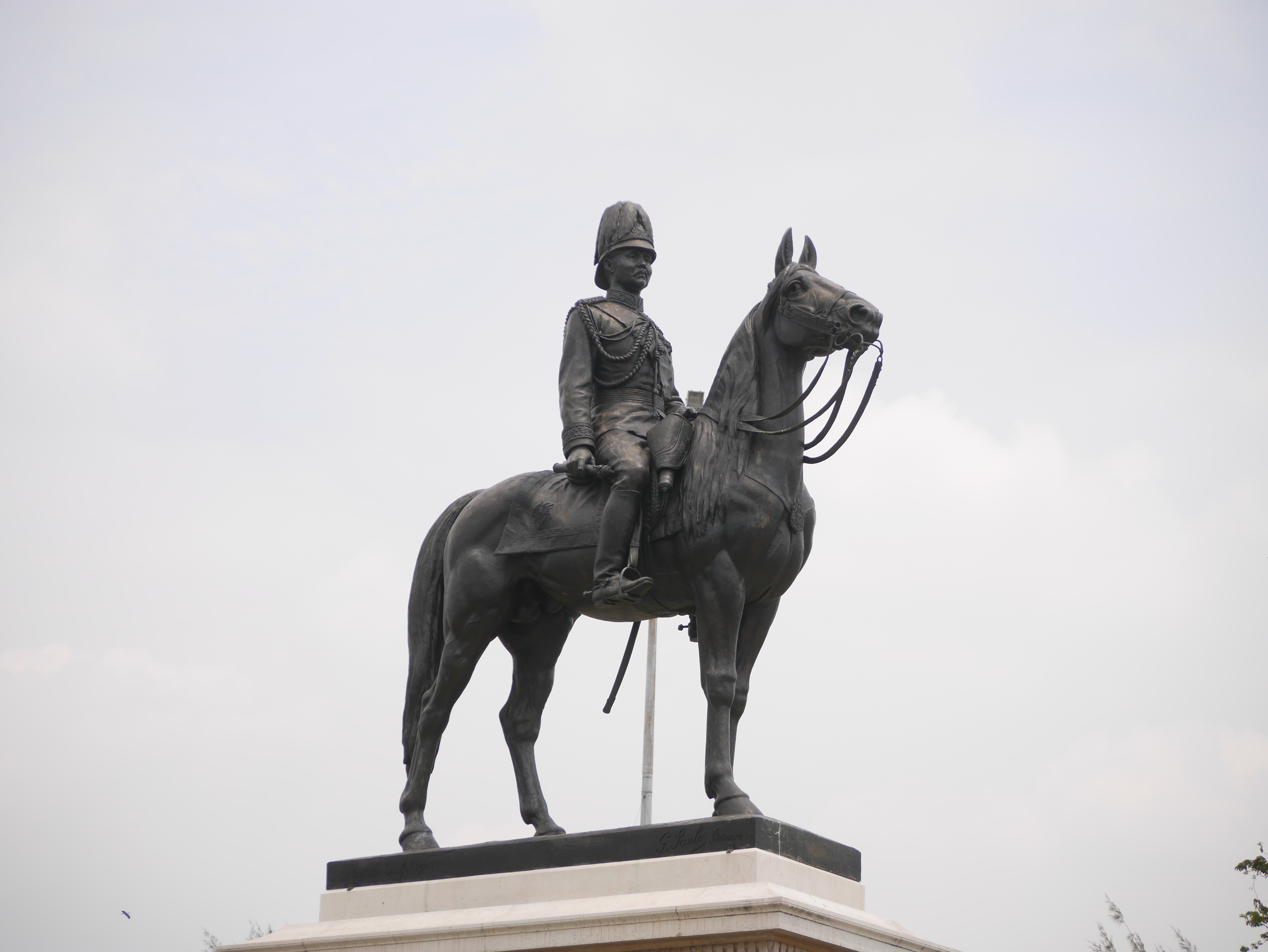
Rama V

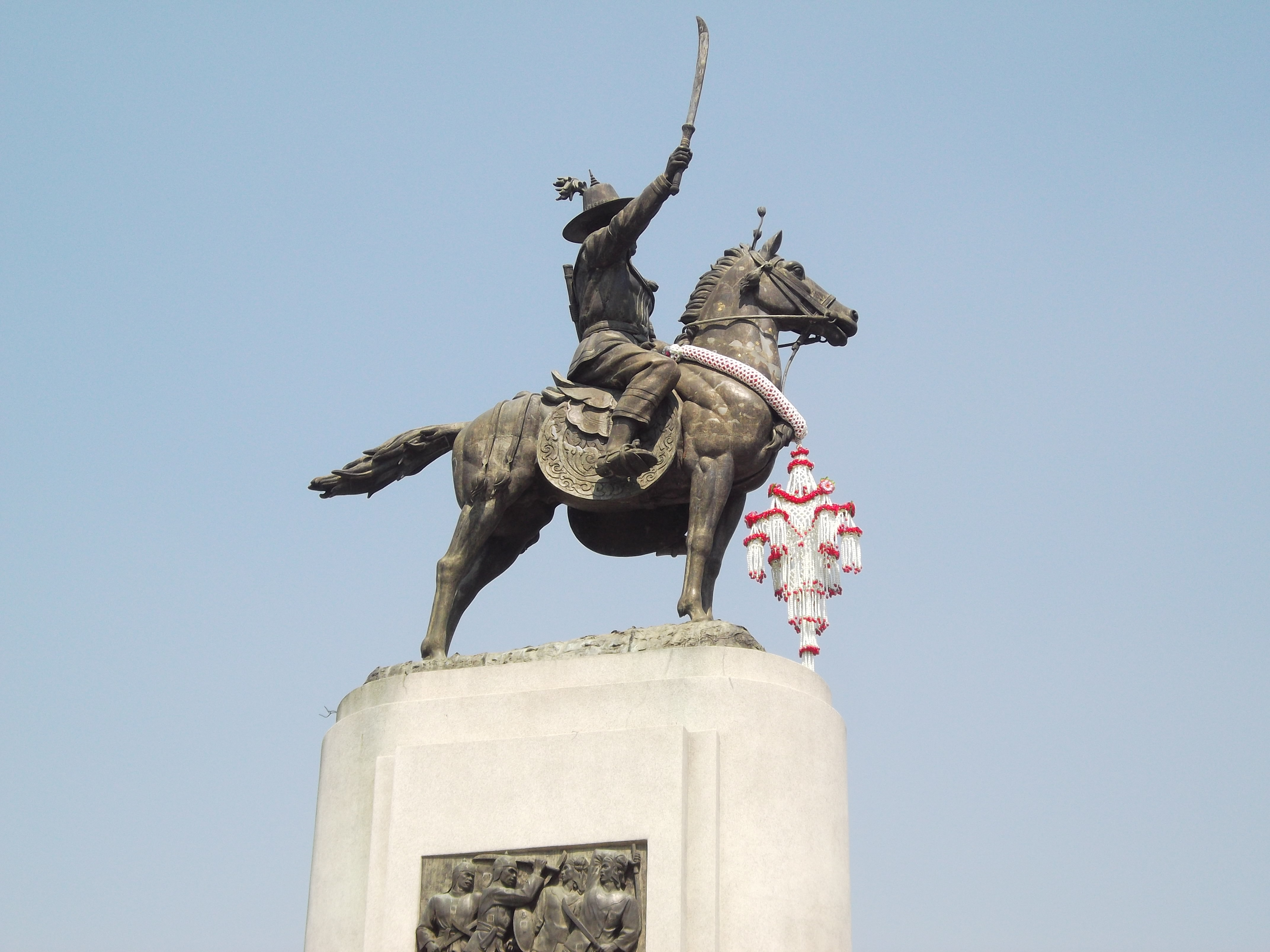
Taksin, Bangkok

Chanthaburi

- Equestrian of King Taksin at Thung Na Choei.
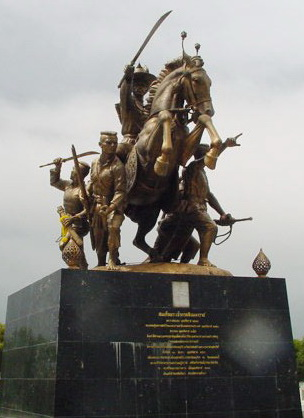
Taksin, Chanthaburi

Chiang Mai

- Equestrian of King Naresuan at Thung Yang Thap.

Lampang

- Equestrian of King Naresuan at Ko Kha.
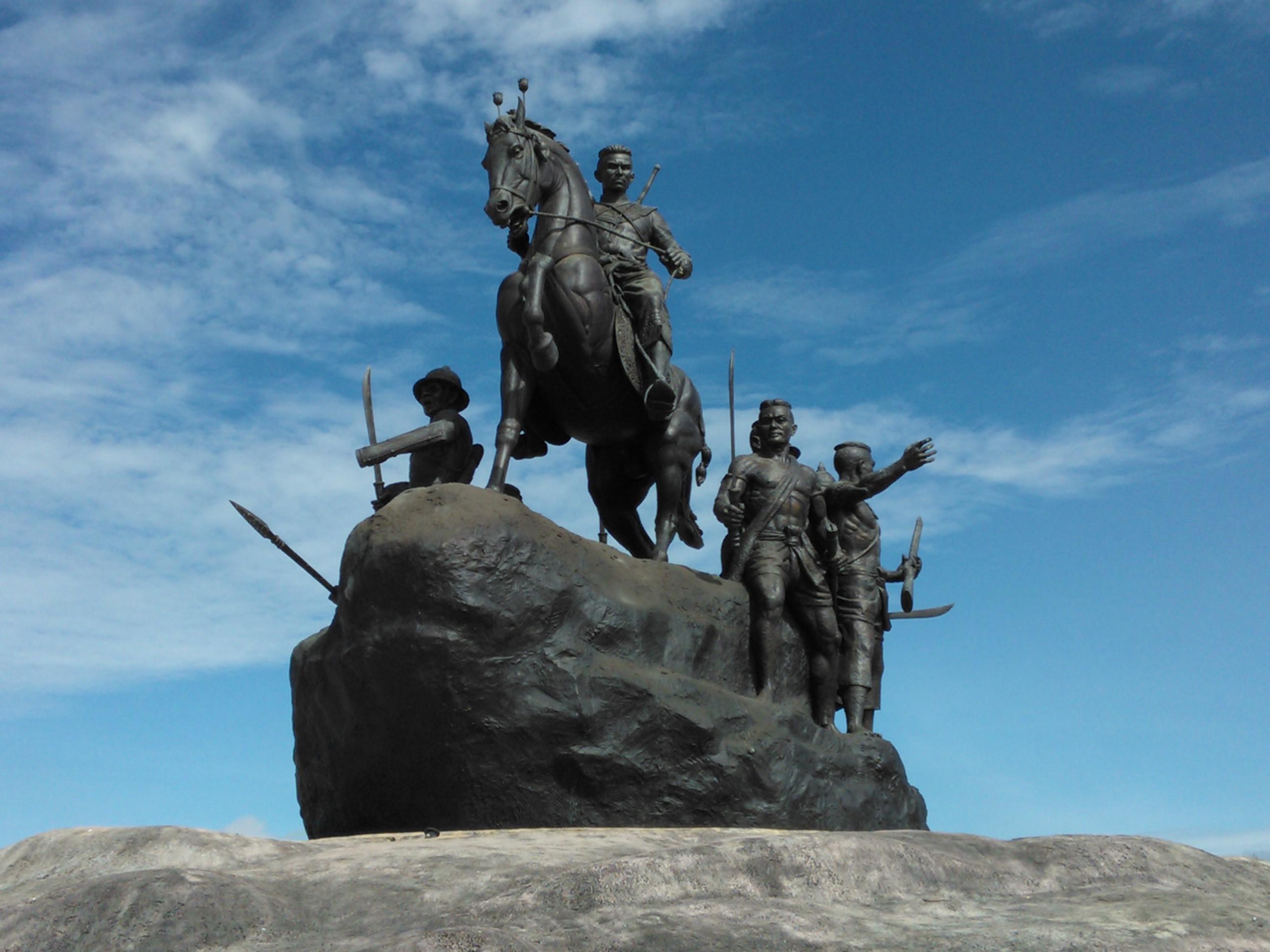
Naresuan, Lampang

Phra Nakhon Si Ayutthaya

- Equestrian of King Naresuan at Thung Makham Yong.
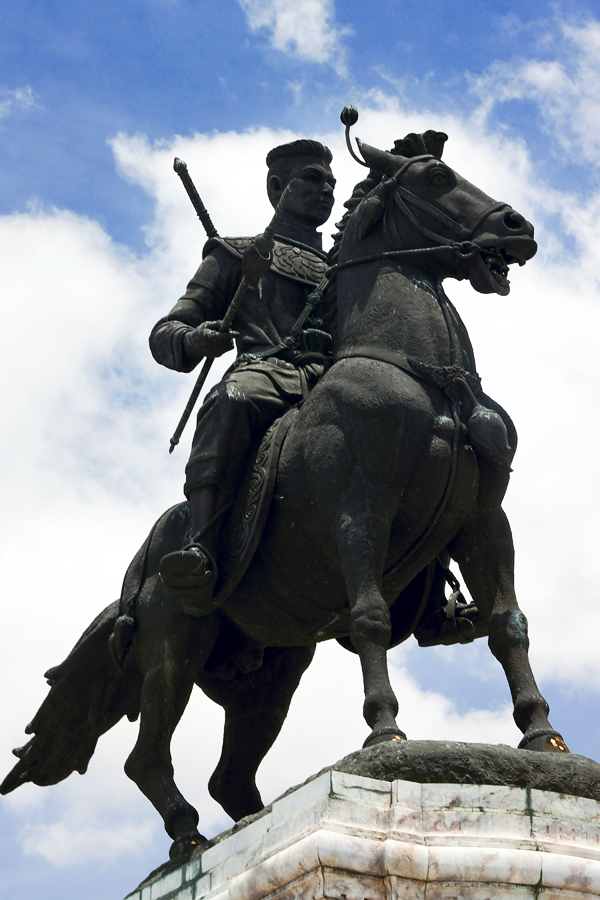
Naresuan, Phra Nakhon Si Ayutthaya

Phitsanulok

- Equestrian of King Rama I at Phitsanulok.
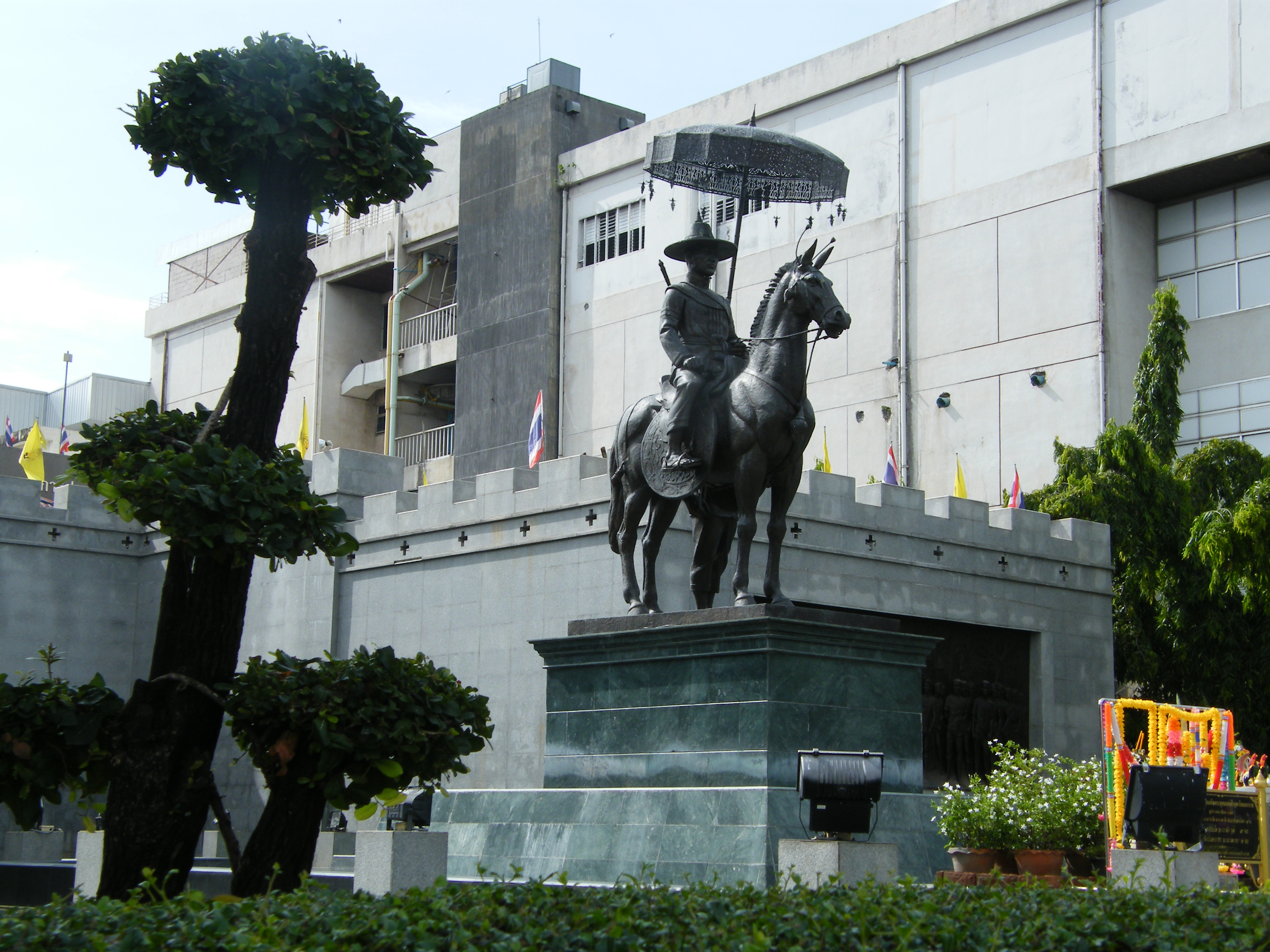
Rama I

Saraburi

- Equestrian of King Taksin at Adisorn Military Camp.

== Tunisia ==
Tunis

- Equestrian of Habib Bourguiba in La Goulette. The statue was initially installed on the Avenue Habib Bourguiba in downtown Tunis in 1978 and was sent to La Goulette in 1987. In 2016 it was restored to the Avenue Habib Bourguiba.
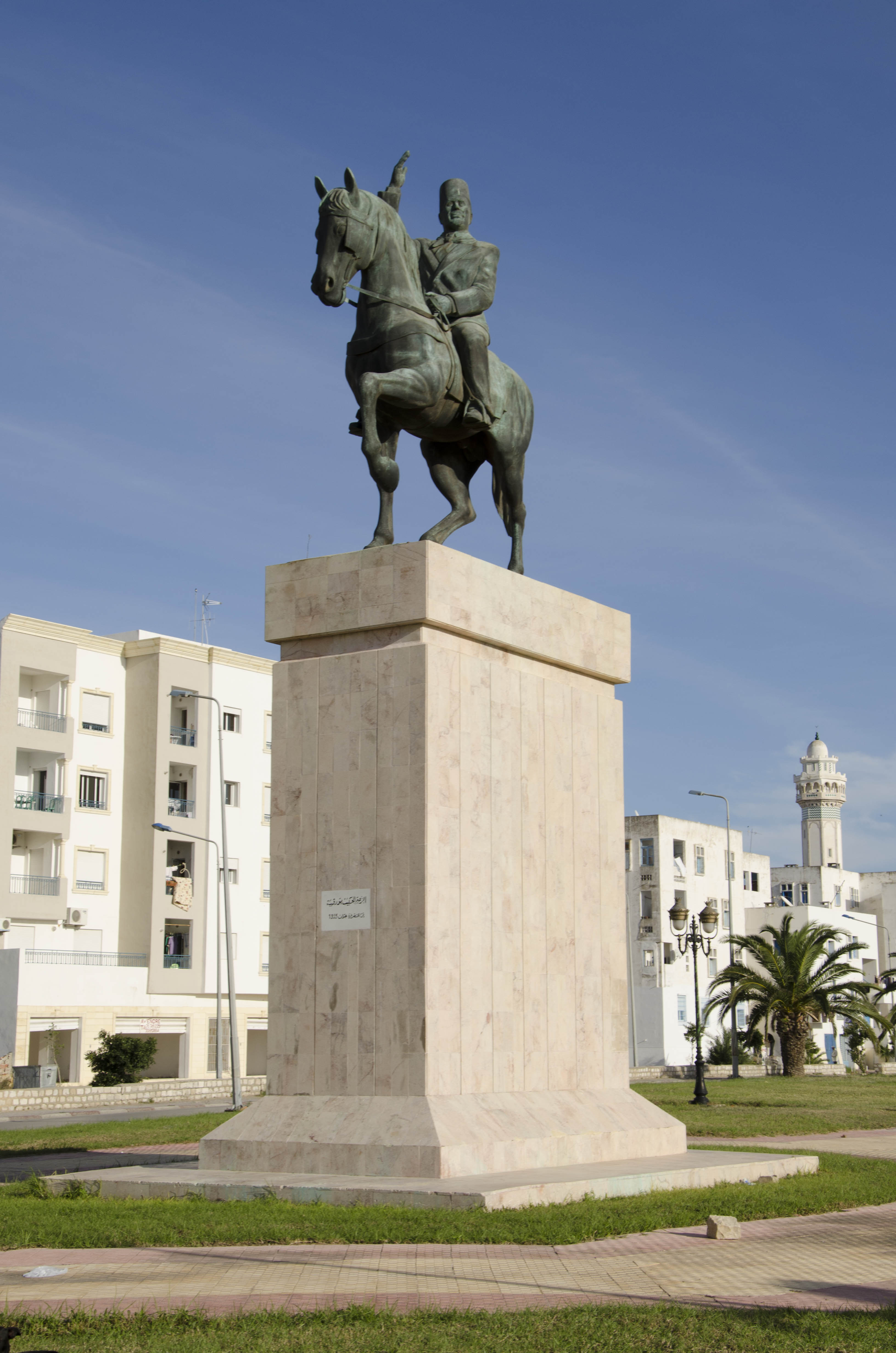
Habib Bourguiba in La Goulette, Tunis, 2013.

== Turkey ==
Ankara

- Equestrian of Mustafa Kemal Atatürk by Heinrich Krippel at the Ulus Square, 1927.
- Equestrian of Mustafa Kemal Atatürk (Industrial warfare under Atatürk control) by Metin Yurdanur, 2001.
- Equestrian of Mustafa Kemal Atatürk by Pietro Canonica in front of the Ethnography Museum, 1927.
- Equestrian named Seğmenler Anıtı by Burhan Alkar in the Seğmenler park, 1983
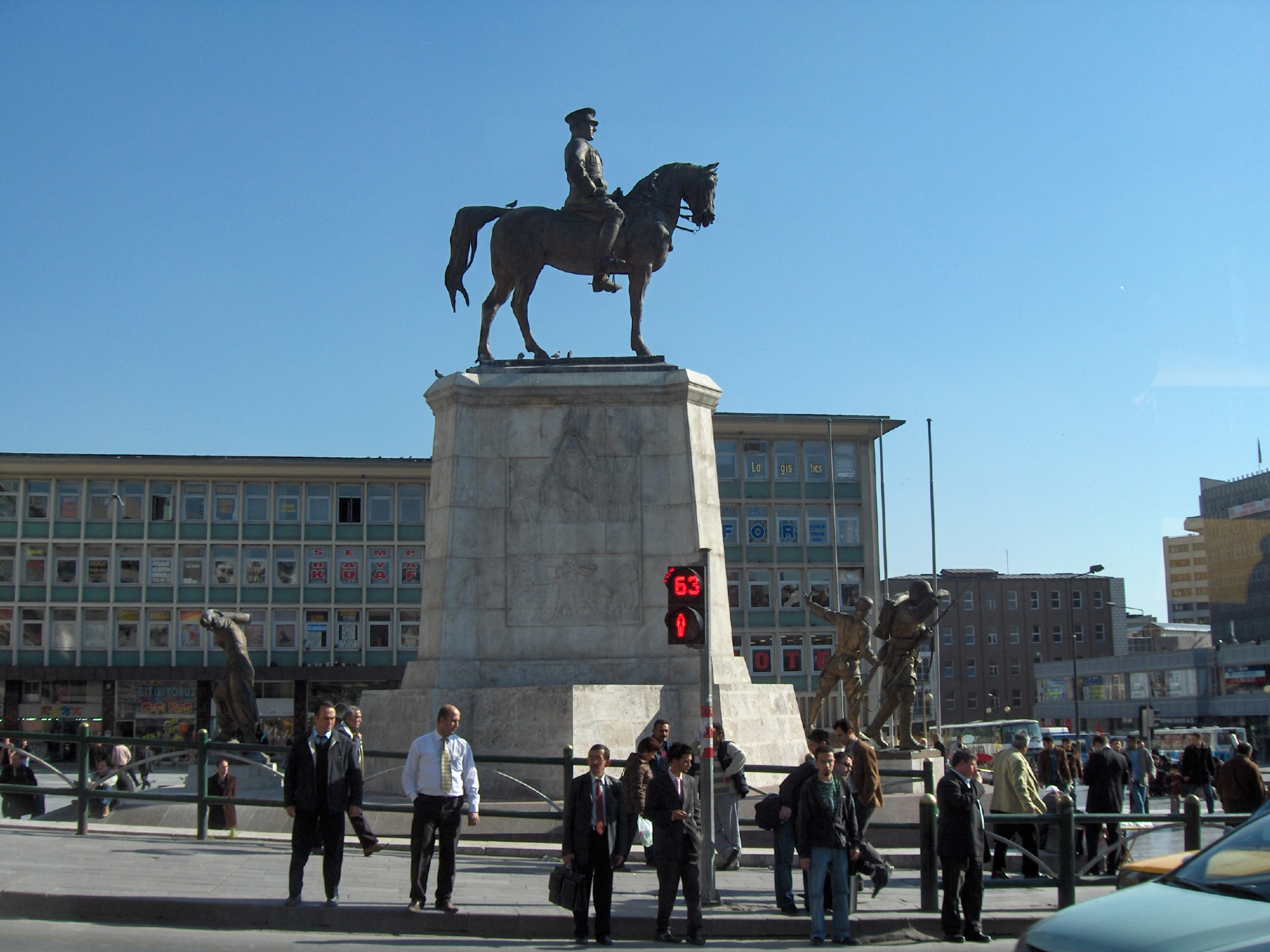
Mustafa Kemal Atatürk at the Ulus Square

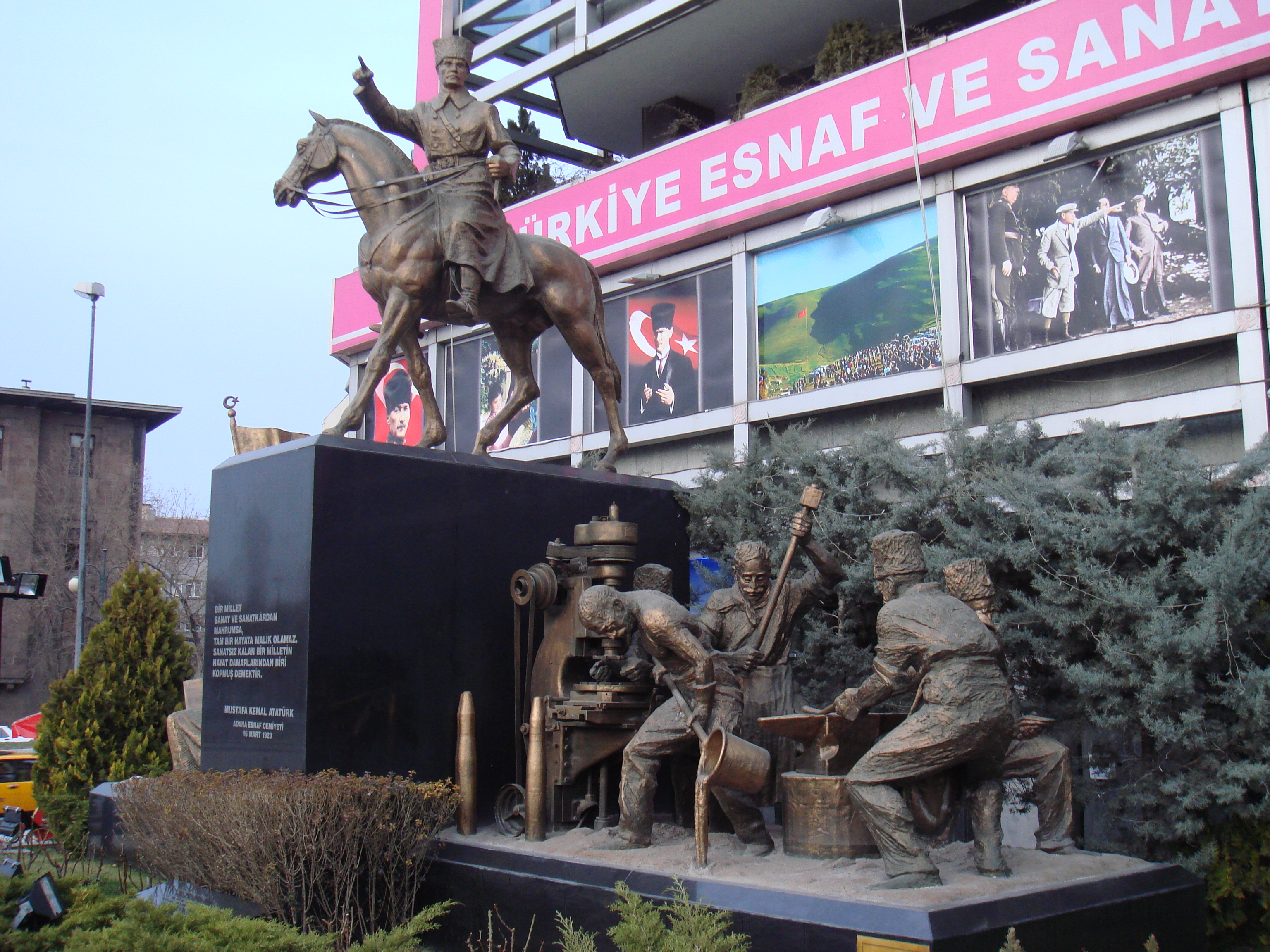
Mustafa Kemal Atatürk in Ankara

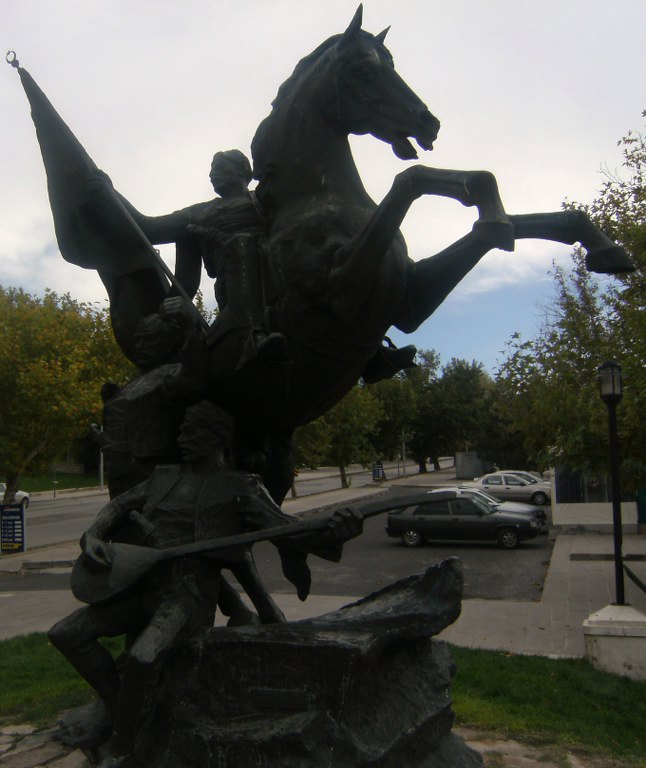
Seğmenler Anıtı in the Seğmenler park

Antalya

- Equestrian of Mustafa Kemal Atatürk by Hüseyin Gezer at the Cumhuriyet Meydani.
- Equestrian of Kaykhusraw I by Meret Öwezov at the Yavuz Özcan park, 2004.

Bursa

- Equestrian of Mustafa Kemal Atatürk.

Samsun

- Statue of Honor by Heinrich Krippel, 1931.
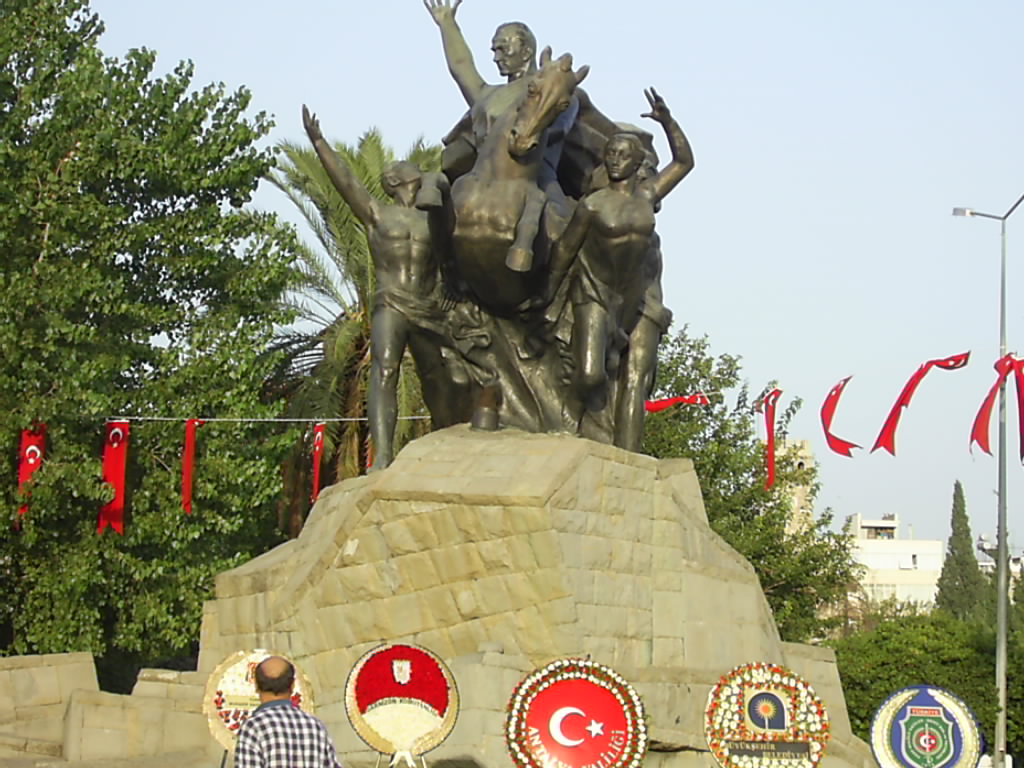
Mustafa Kemal Atatürk in Antalya

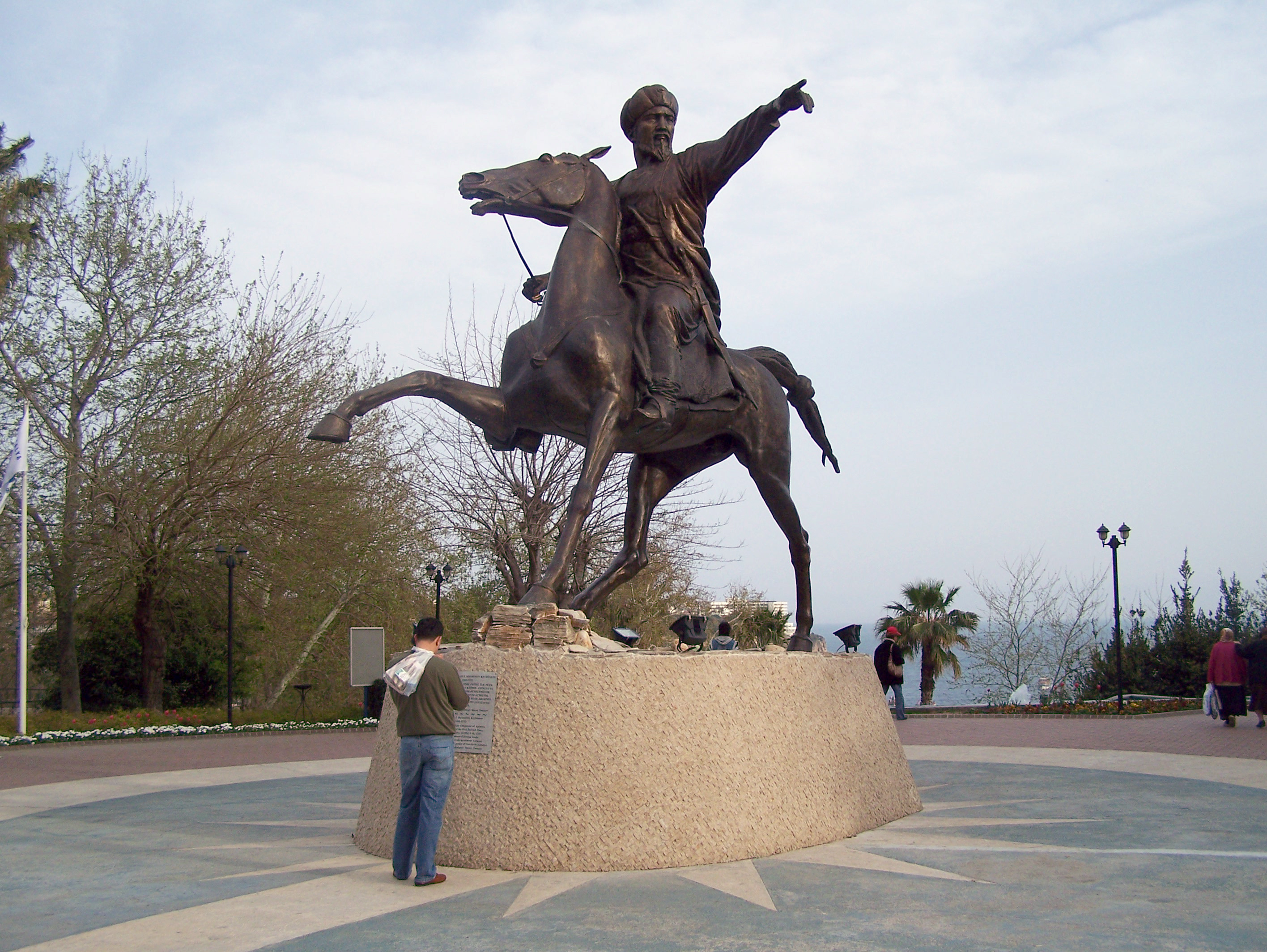
Kaykhusraw I in Antalya

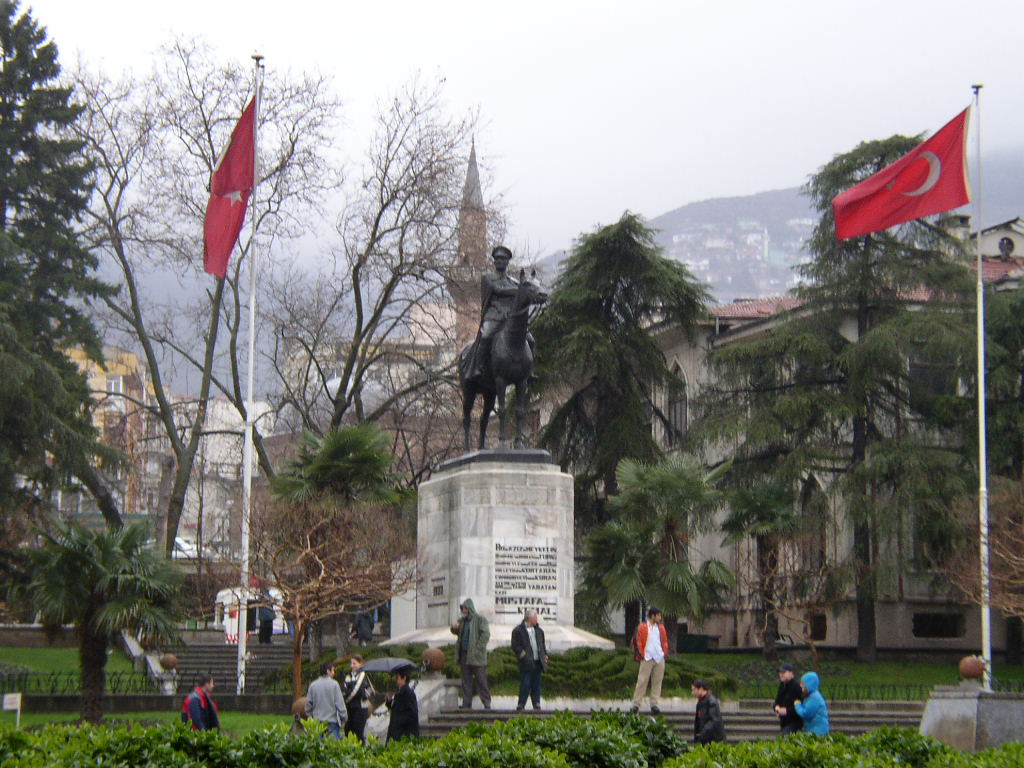
Mustafa Kemal Atatürk in Bursa

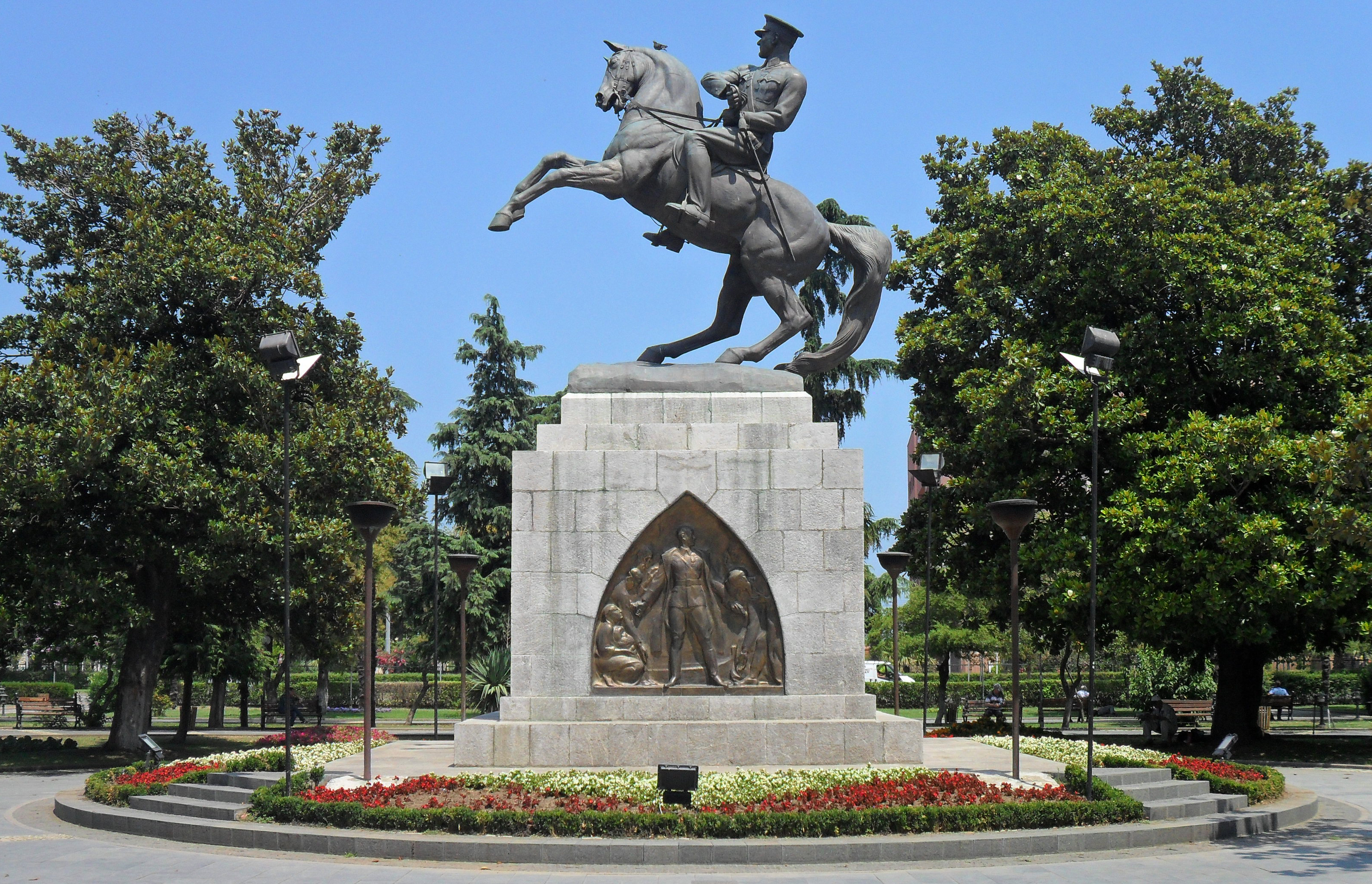
Mustafa Kemal Atatürk in Samsun

== Ukraine ==
Kyiv

- Equestrian of Bohdan Khmelnytsky. Opened July 11, 1888 at the Sofia area. Sculptor Michael Mikeshin.
- Equestrian of Petro Konashevych-Sahaidachny at Kontraktova Square. Established in 2001. Architects: Jarikov and Kuharenko. Sculptors: Shvetsov, Krylov, Sidoruk.
- Monument of Nikolay Shchors in Taras Shevchenko Boulevard. The monument was unveiled April 29, 1954. Sculptors: Boroday, Sukhodolov, Lysenko, architects: Zavarov and Vlasov.
- Monument of Cossack Mamay at Maidan Nezalezhnosti.
- Monument "To the defenders of the boundaries of the Fatherland of all generations" (Cossacks) at Zolotovorotskaya street.
- Monument of Sviatoslav I at Lviv Square.
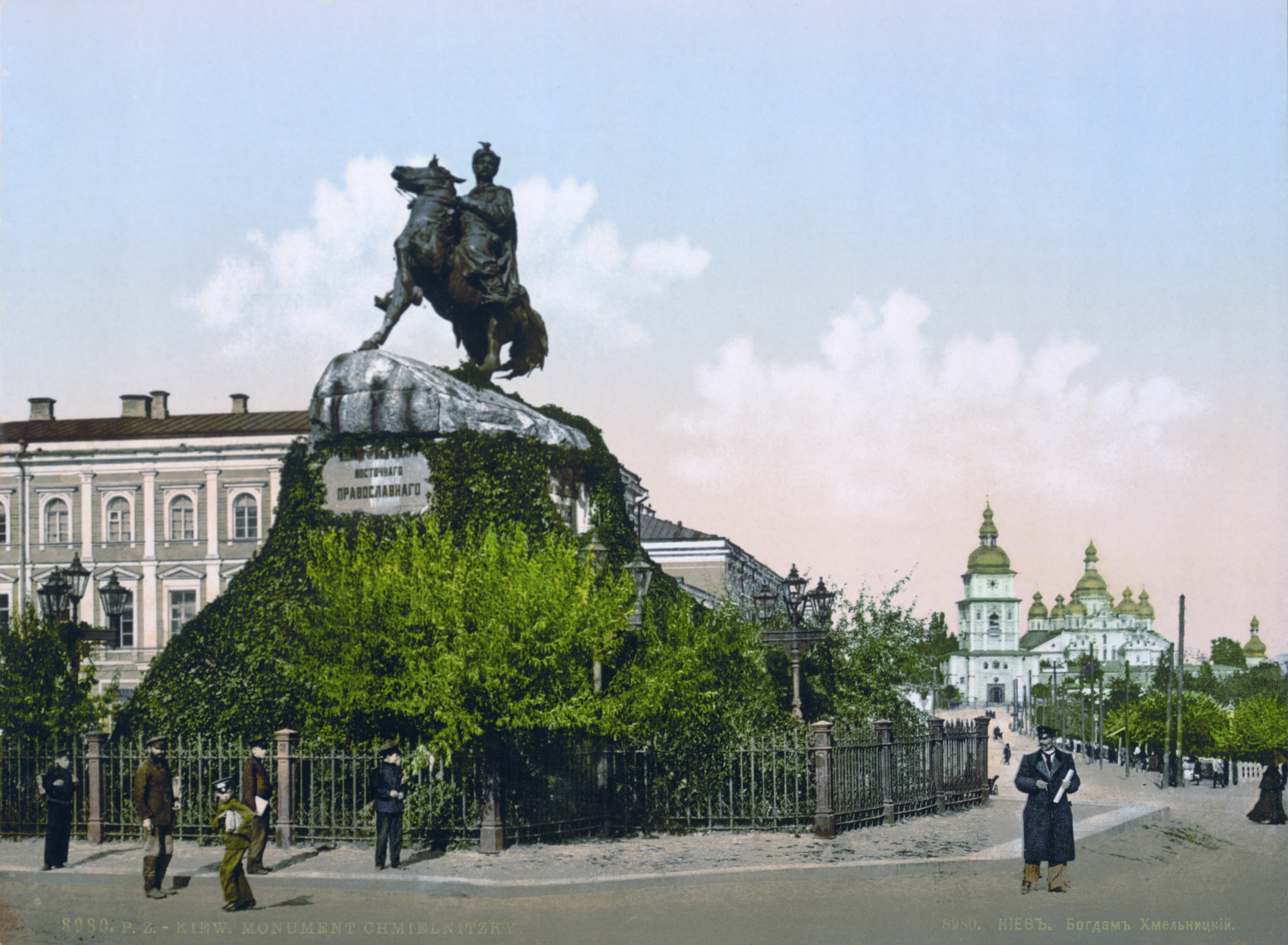
Bohdan Khmelnytsky

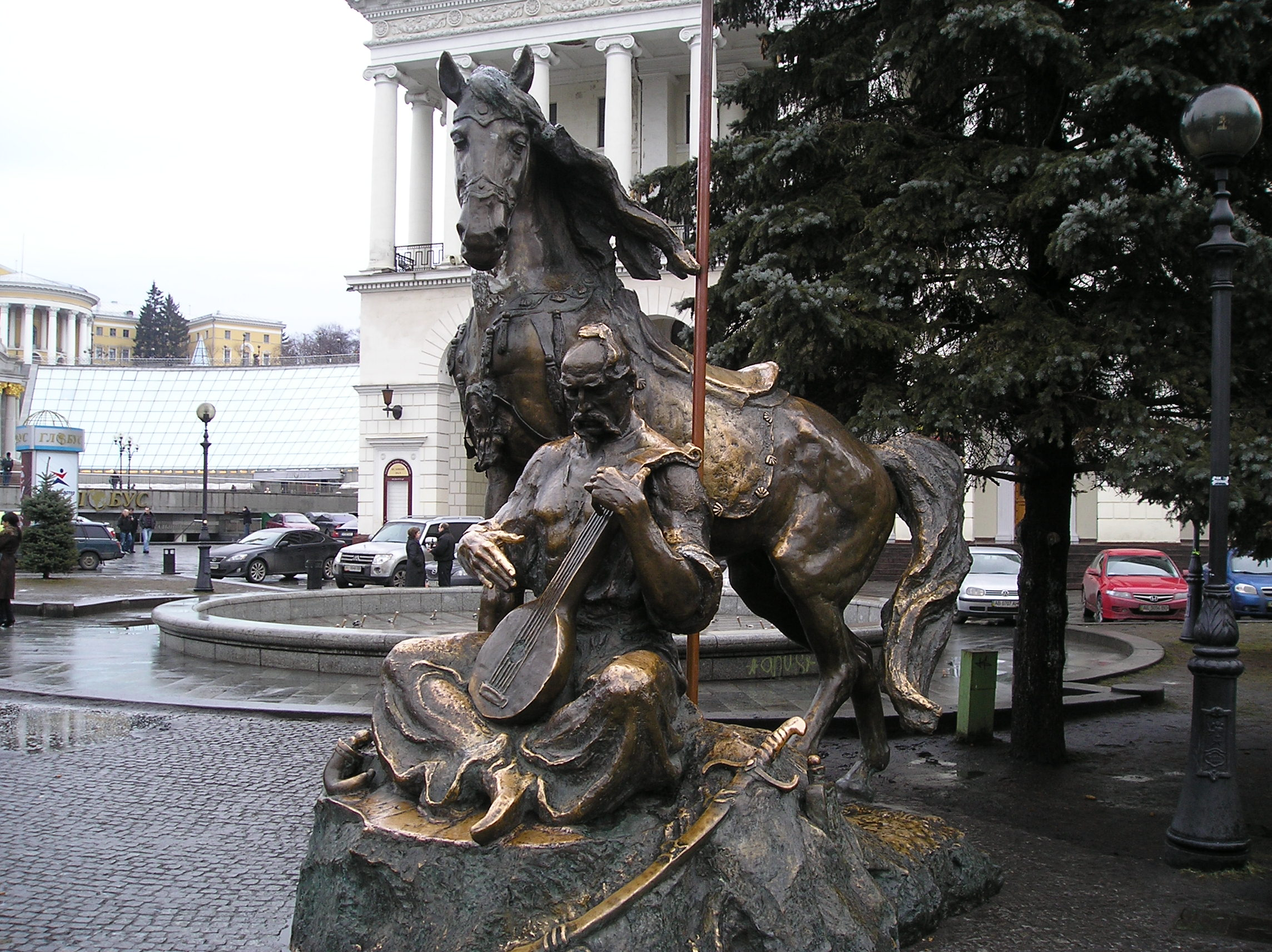
Cossack Mamay

Izmail

- Equestrian monument of Alexander Suvorov at Suvorov avenue. Foto

Kamianka-Buzka

- Monument to the 1st Cavalry Army near the city.

Kharkiv

- Monument to the founders of Kharkiv (Cossack Kharko statue).

Luhansk

- Monument of Kliment Voroshilov.
- Monument of Prince Igor (between Luhansk and Stanytsia Luhanska).

Lviv

- Equestrian of Daniel of Halych.

== Uruguay ==
Montevideo

- Equestrian of José Gervasio Artigas at the La Plaza Independencia.

Minas

- Equestrian of José Gervasio Artigas by Setillo Belloni in Cerro Ventura, 1974.
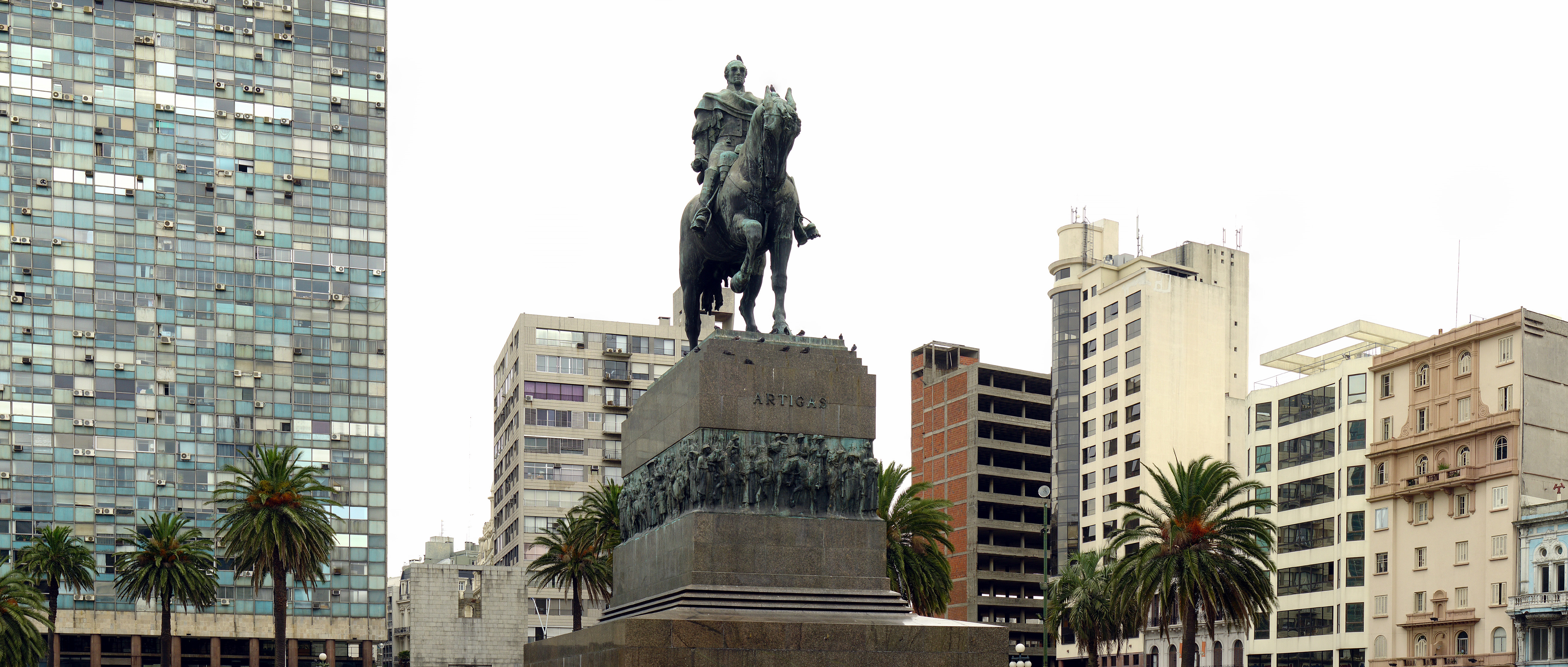
Artigas in Montevideo

== Uzbekistan ==
Tashkent

- Equestrian of Tamerlane at the Amir Timur Square at the end of the pedestrian street.

== Venezuela ==
Caracas

- Equestrian of Simón Bolívar at the Plaza Bolívar, in the centre of the city. 1870s replica of the original in Lima.
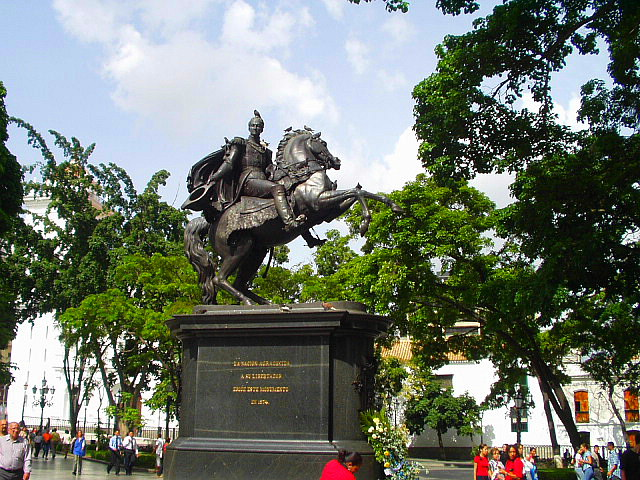
Simón Bolívar in Caracas

== Vietnam ==
=== Ho Chi Minh City ===
Phu Dong Thien Vuong in 1 District

Quang Trung Emperor in 10 District

Tran Nguyen Han in 1 District

=== Ha Noi ===
Thanh Giong

=== Binh Dinh ===
Quang Trung Emperor
