= Gardet =

Gardet is a French surname. Notable people with the surname include:

- Georges Gardet (1863–1939), French sculptor and animalier
- Louis Gardet (1904–1986), French Roman Catholic priest and historian

== See also ==
- Gärdet, part of Stockholm, Sweden
- Gärdet metro station in Stockholm
