= Playing Angels =

Sculpture series in Philadelphia, Pennsylvania, USA

Playing Angels is a sculpture series along the Schuylkill River and Kelly Drive in Philadelphia, Pennsylvania. It consists of three boy-shaped angels standing about six feet tall with wings and musical instruments. The bronze pieces are balanced on separate concrete pedestals overlooking the river bank and are about a mile away from Boathouse Row.

== Background ==
The figures are cast from three angel statues created in 1950 in Millesgården, Sweden by Swedish artist Carl Milles. The city of Philadelphia commissioned Milles to complete five angel statues and planned to place them in a private location. However, when these plans fell through, two of the statues were purchased by Kansas City, Missouri and Falls Church, Virginia, and the remaining three were incorporated outside Milles' property in Millesgården, Sweden. In 1968 casts of the three figures were bought by the Fairmount Park Art Association and installed by the Schuylkill River banks between Columbia Bridge and Girard Bridge in 1972.

The statues underwent a restoration process in 2014 after one of the figures was seen tilting.
