= Folke Filbyter =

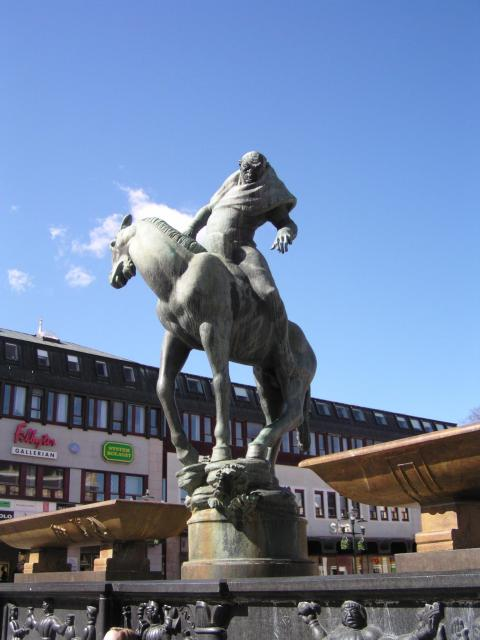
Folke Filbyter searching for his grandchild, Folkungabrunnen by Carl Milles in Linköping

Folke Filbyter is the popularized name of the pagan progenitor of the House of Bjälbo clan. Since Folke is said to have been the great-great-grandfather of Birger Brosa, he would have lived in the 11th century.

His cognomen Filbyter is believed to mean "foal biter" and refers to a man who castrates colts with his teeth.

== Folke Filbyter in fiction ==
- Folke Filbyter appears as a tragic scorned father in Folkungaträdet (1905), by the Swedish writer Verner von Heidenstam. In Heidenstam's work, Folke has returned home to Sweden from many questionable acts during his Viking expeditions and settling down he founds the estate Folketuna. There he has three children with a dwarfish woman and although they are wealthy they live in the same dirty poverty as their thralls. Two of the sons depart for adventures in Russia while the third son kidnaps a girl who bears him a son before dying in childbirth. Folke is an atheist who does not hesitate to destroy both the idols of the old faith and those of the new faith. When his remaining son converts to Christianity, he gives his little child to an itinerant preacher. Folke cannot accept that his grandson and heir has disappeared, and so he departs searching for his grandson. Eventually, Folke finds both his grandson and the two sons who had gone abroad. The reunion is tragic and the self-sacrificing, humiliated and scorned Folke exclaims "the love of your hearts, my children, you cannot give me, and that was all that I ever asked for.
- Folke Filbyter also appears in Frans G. Bengtsson's The Long Ships, published in the 1940s.
