= Aviator Monument =

Aviator Monument or Aviators' Monument is the name of the following monuments:

- Aviator Monument (Warsaw)
- Aviator Monument (Stockholm)
- Monument to the Heroes of the Air, Romania
