= Karlaplan =

Park-plaza in Stockholm

Coordinates: 59°20′19″N 18°05′26″E

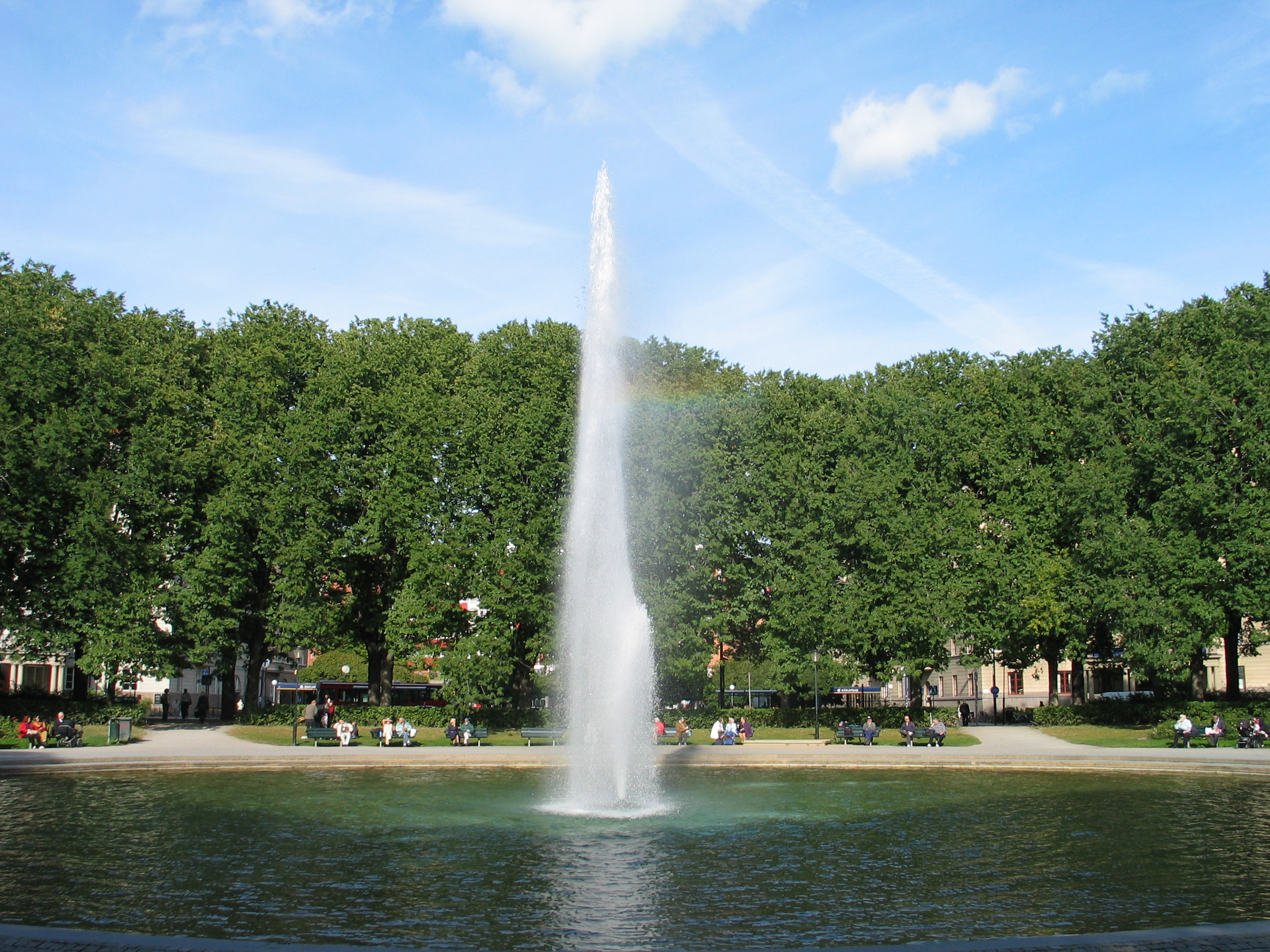
Fountain at Karlaplan

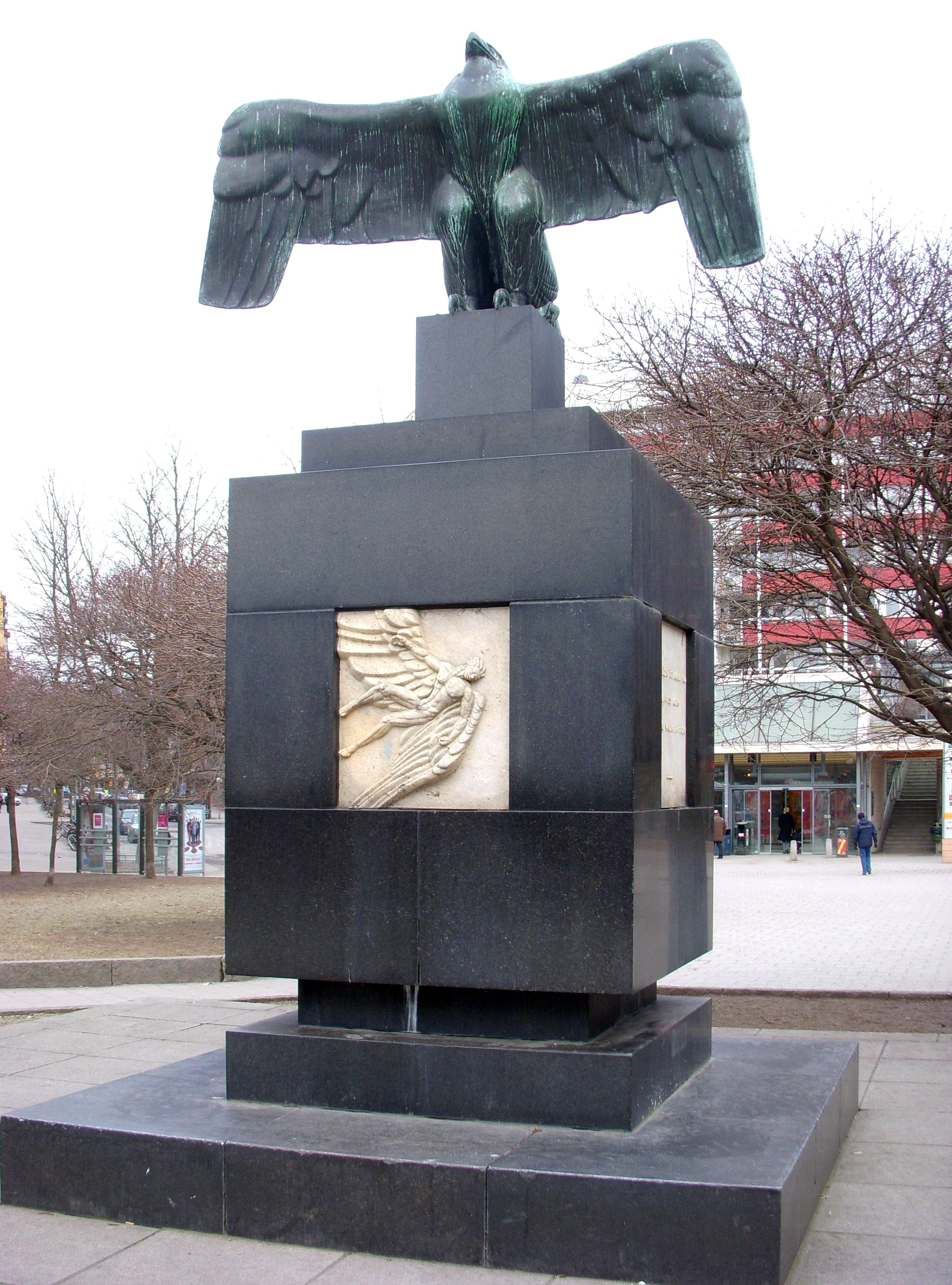
Flygarmonumentet by sculptor Carl Milles

Karlaplan is an open park-plaza area in Östermalm in central Stockholm, Sweden.

== History ==
Lindhagenplanen was a general plan presented with a proposal for street regulation in Stockholm in 1866 by a committee headed by the lawyer and politician Albert Lindhagen (1823-1887). Construction of Karlaplan started in 1896. It was designed in the image of Place de l'Étoile in Paris. The plaza is named in honour of three Swedish kings: Karl X Gustav, Karl XI and Karl XII.

In the late 1920s, plans proposed by architect Ragnar Hjorth (1887-1971) provided for with a circular basin and a fountain. In 1930, the large fountain basin was started, which is slightly recessed in relation to the surrounding street level.

During World War I, planting was supplemented with chestnut and poplar trees while the park was also used to cultivate vegetables.

Flygarmonumentet, a monument designed in 1931 by sculptor Carl Milles (1875–1955), is located at Karlaplan. Playwright and novelist August Strindberg (1849–1912) lived on Karlaplan from 1901 until 1908. It remains one of the most exclusive and expensive places to live in Stockholm city, adjacent to the Royal Park, Djurgården.

== See also ==
- Karlaplan metro station
