= Saint Paul City Hall and Ramsey County Courthouse =

- U.S. National Register of Historic Places
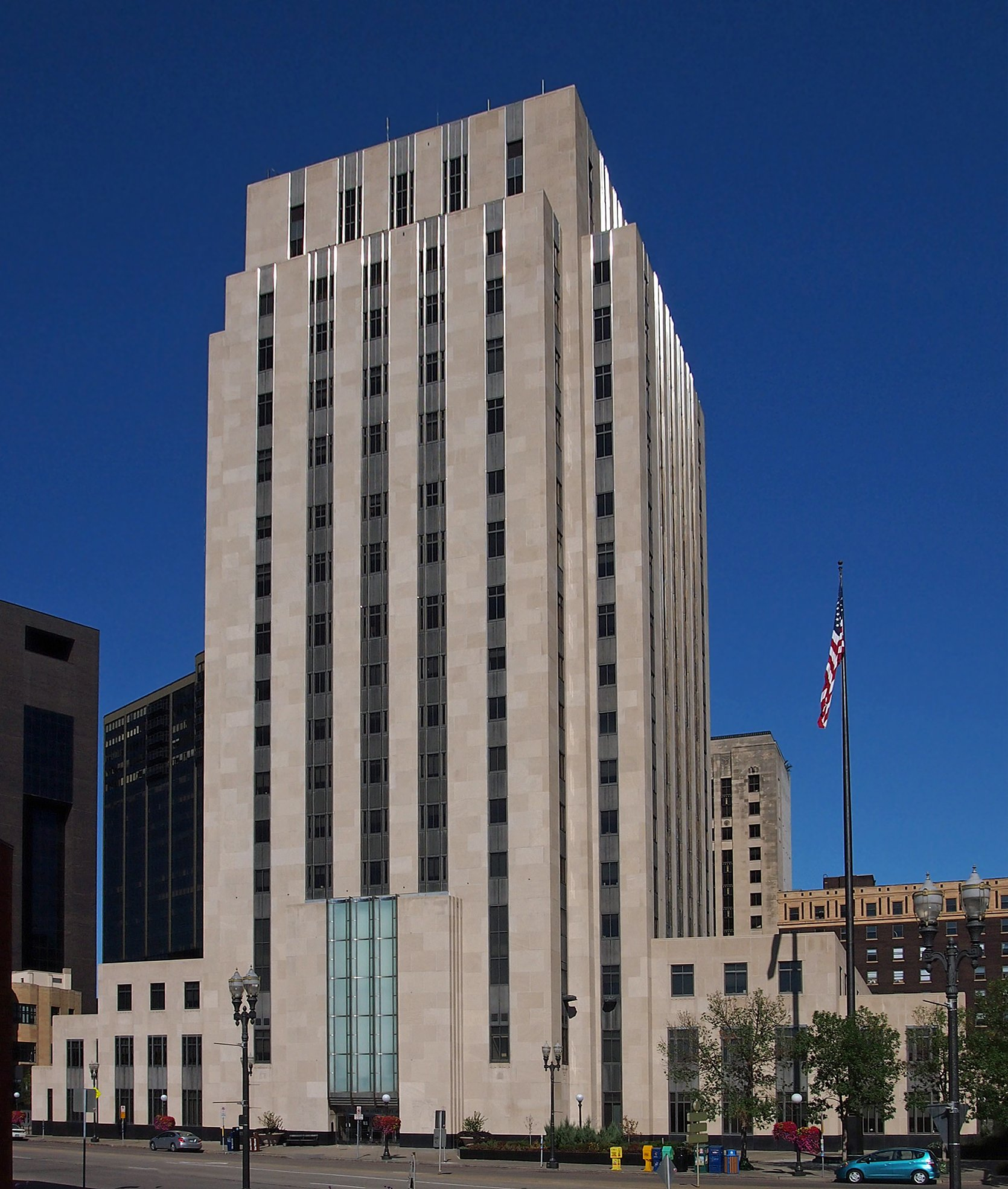
- Saint Paul City Hall and Ramsey County Courthouse from the southeast

- Location within Minnesota Location within the United States
- Interactive map showing the location of Saint Paul City Hall and Ramsey County Courthouse
- Location: 15 Kellogg Boulevard West, Saint Paul, Minnesota
- Coordinates: 44°56′38.5″N 93°05′37.1″W
- Area: less than one acre
- Built: 1932
- Architect: Thomas Ellerbe & Company and Holabird & Root
- Architectural style: Art Deco
- NRHP reference No.: 83000940
- Added to NRHP: February 11, 1983

The Saint Paul City Hall and Ramsey County Courthouse, located at 15 Kellogg Boulevard West in Saint Paul, Ramsey County, in the U.S. state of Minnesota, is a twenty-story Art Deco skyscraper completed in 1932. Built during the Great Depression—a period of high unemployment and falling prices—the building's four-million-dollar budget was underspent, resulting in higher quality materials and craftsmanship than initially expected.

The exterior consists of smooth Indiana limestone in the Art Deco style known as "American Perpendicular." The building was designed by Thomas Ellerbe & Company of Saint Paul and Holabird & Root of Chicago, drawing inspiration from Finnish architect Eliel Saarinen. The vertical rows of windows are connected by plain, flat, black spandrels. Above the Fourth Street entrance and flanking the Kellogg Boulevard entrance are relief sculptures carved by Lee Lawrie.

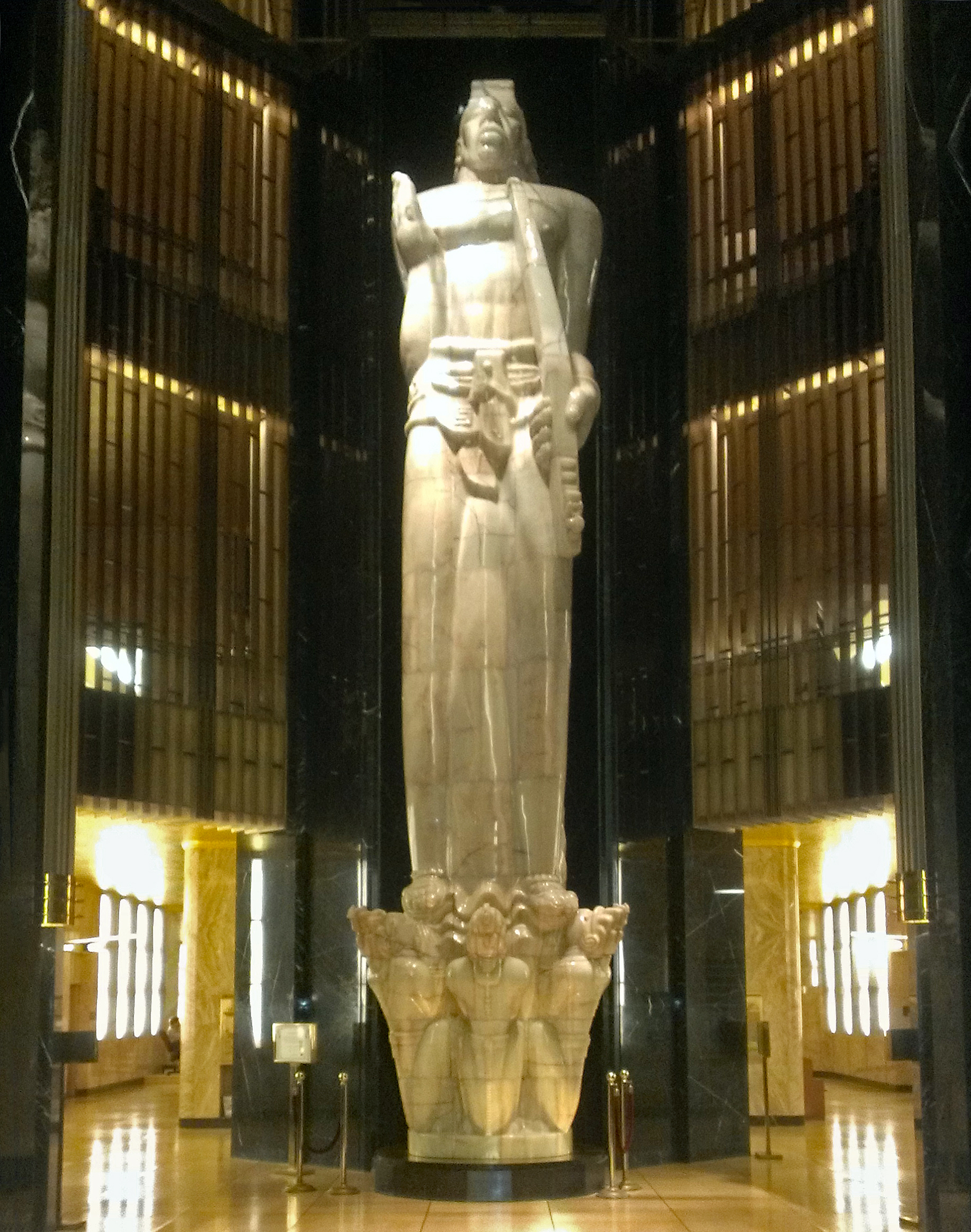
Vision of Peace (originally Indian God of Peace) by Carl Milles, 1936

The interior design, in the "Zigzag Moderne" style, was inspired by the Exposition Internationale des Arts Décoratifs et Industriels Modernes, which emphasized soft ornamentation and sensuous curves. In Memorial Hall, the white marble floor contrasts with three-story black marble piers that lead to a gold-leaf ceiling. At the end of the hall stands the 60-ton, 38 feet (11.6 m) white onyx sculpture Indian God of Peace by Carl Milles, later renamed Vision of Peace.

Other notable features include woodwork crafted from twenty-three different species of wood and five types of imported marble. Murals were painted by John W. Norton, and the six bronze elevator doors were created by Albert Stewart.

== See also ==
- List of tallest buildings in Saint Paul
