= The Hand of God (Carl Milles) =

Statue by Swedish artist Carl Milles

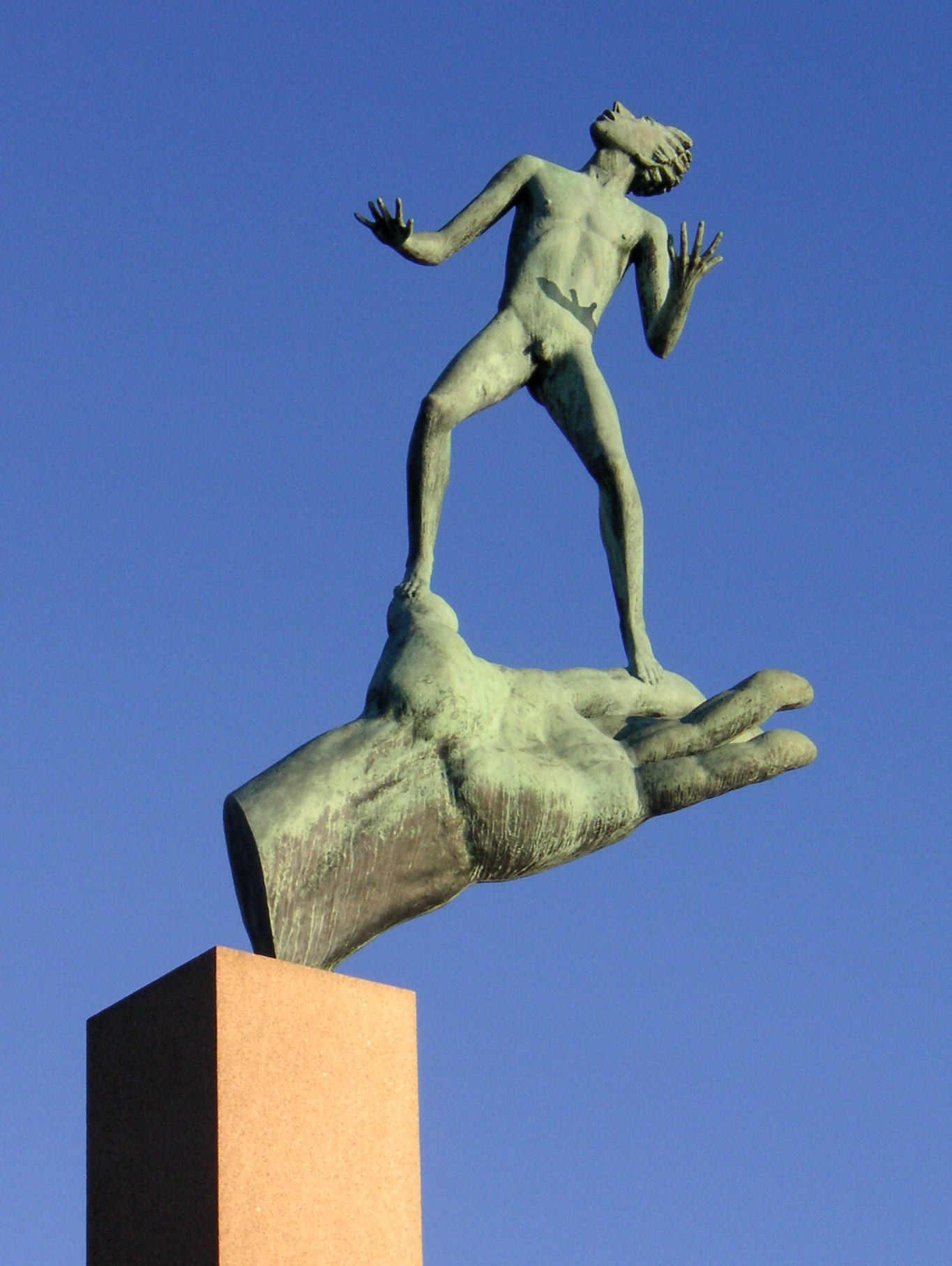
The Hand of God

The Hand of God is one of the last works of the Swedish sculptor Carl Milles, created to honor the Swedish entrepreneur C. E. Johansson, who revolutionized precision measuring of industrial parts. The original casting stands in Johansson's hometown of Eskilstuna, Sweden.

== History ==
Carl Milles worked on The Hand of God from 1949 to 1953. The sculptor said the idea of the statue came to him in a dream. During his time in Paris, Carl Milles was influenced by the work of Auguste Renoir, who was also fascinated by hands.

The sculpture was recast and donated by the UAW to the city of Detroit, Michigan, where it stands outside the Frank Murphy Hall of Justice (42°20′16″N 83°02′34″W).

In 1957, the Swedish government gave a reproduction of The Hand of God to the royal family of Indonesia, which is exhibited in the gardens of the Bogor Palace. In June 2004, the city of Beijing bought a reproduction of The Hand of God and placed it in the city's International Sculpture Park. A reproduction of The Hand of God is also given as part of the Global Award for Entrepreneurship Research. A reproduction of The Hand of God stands also in the Hakone Open-Air Museum in Hakone, Japan

== Description ==
The statue is of a small naked man - looking upwards, body tensed - standing on the index and thumb of a large hand. The statue stands on a tall, square column. Authentic reproductions are marked with a "Millesgården" tag. The artist provided many different interpretations for this work. One of those reproductions stands in the Hakone Open-Air Museum.

The sketch of the hand was modeled after the artist's left hand.
