= Aviator Monument (Stockholm) =

Sculpture by Carl Milles

Coordinates: 59°20′17″N 18°05′25″E

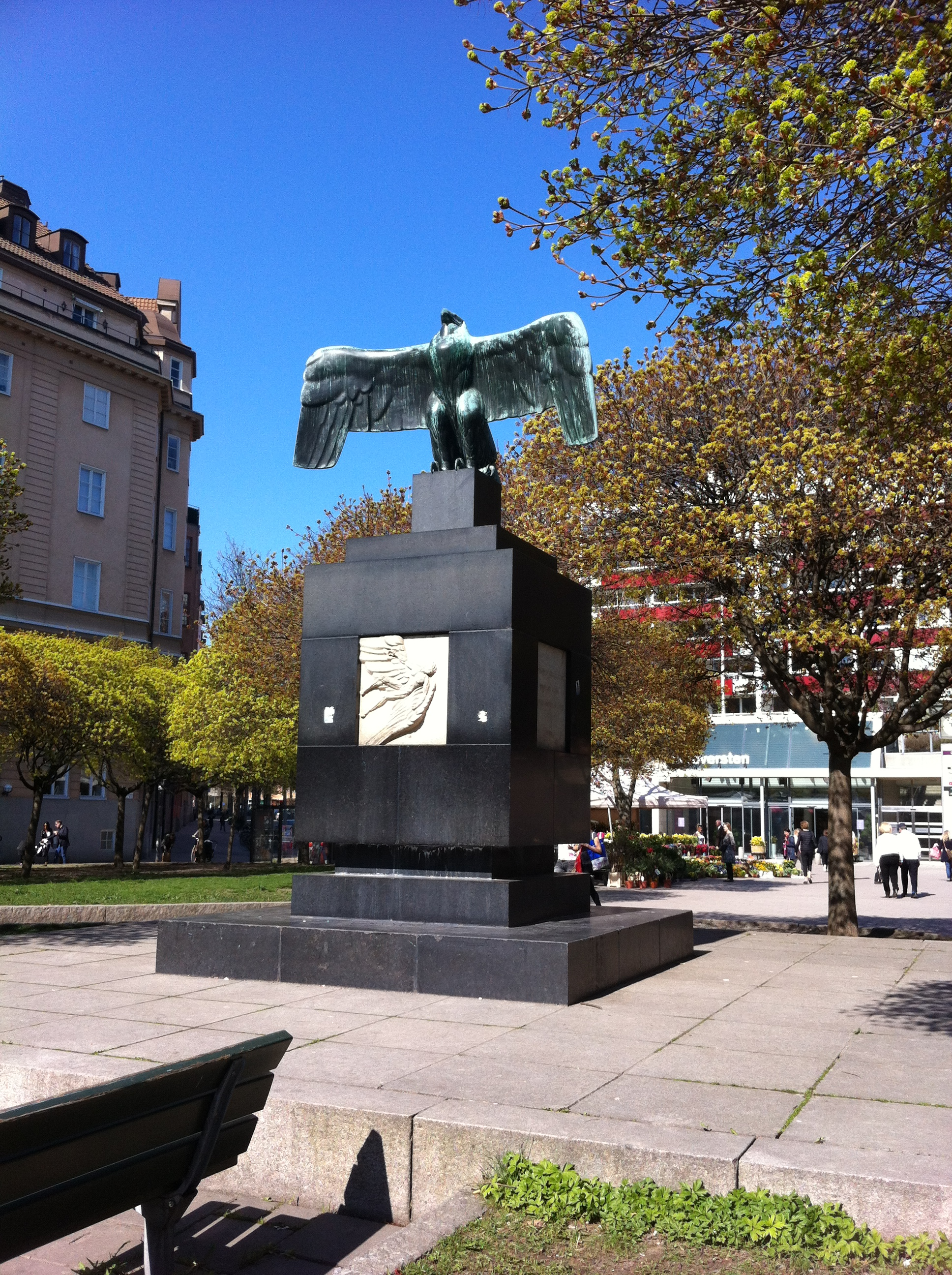
Flygarmonumentet

The Aviator Monument (Swedish: 'Flygarmonumentet') is a statue that stands at Karlaplan in central Stockholm, Sweden. The statue was a gift from the Swedish Aeronautical Society in memory of different Swedish aviation pioneers who fell in both the North Pole expedition of 1898 and in the Swedish aviator era in 1917. The task to build the monument was given to the famous sculptor Carl Milles. The Aviator Monument was finished in 1931.

== The statue ==
The monument is a sculpture of a large eagle with outstretched wings about to lift. Height 185 cm, width 750 cm and depth 185 cm. On the plinth which the statue is standing on are reliefs of Icarus, balloonists and early warplanes. Milles thought that an eagle would be an excellent symbol. Inside the shallow monument there is an urn, which contains medals for each fallen Swedish pilot.

== History ==
Based on his sympathy towards Hitler, some art historians think that the Aviator Monument is an expression of Carl Milles admiration for Nazism. The eagle with its outstretched wings is often associated with the Nazi symbol, The Nazi Eagle. In the 1940s, young Swedish Nazis used the monument as a meeting point, and a place for gathering and commemoration. During this time young socialists sabotaged the statue with graffiti in protests against Nazis. The Swedish Air Force used it as a monument for a wreath-laying ceremony.

The original purpose of this statue is to honour fallen pilots such as Salomon August Andrée, Nils Strindberg and Knut Fraenkel who died in the North Pole expedition in 1898. The monument was taken down during the construction of the Karlaplan metro station and re-erected again in 1967.
