= Folkungabrunnen =

Fountain in Linköping, Sweden

- Fountain
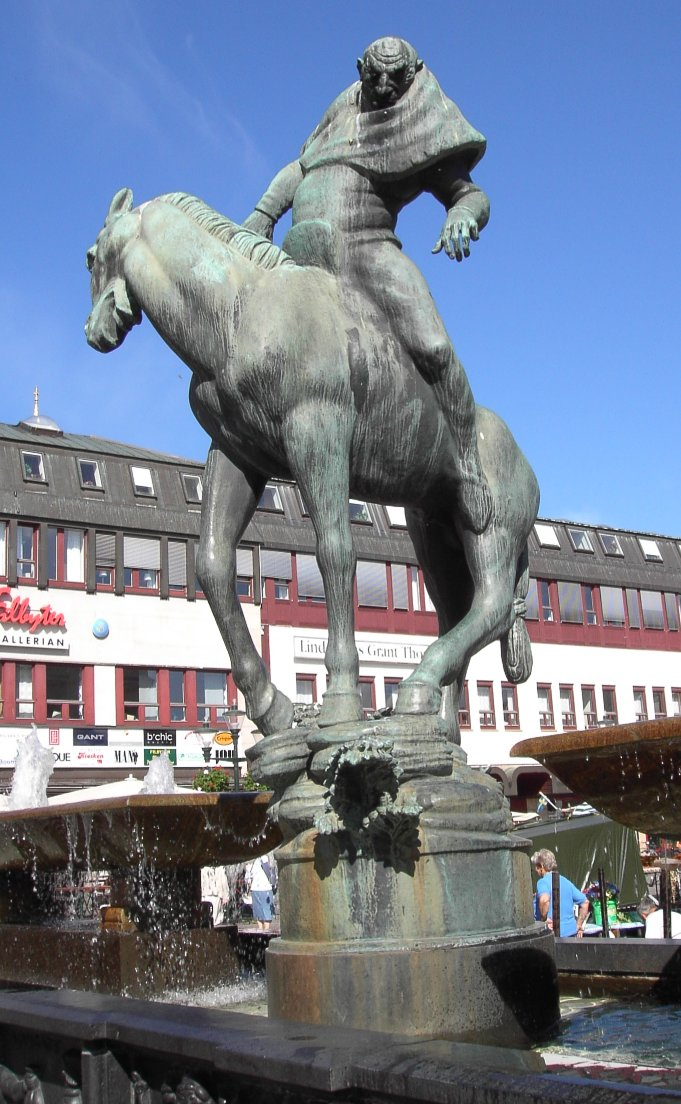
- Design: Carl Milles
- Opened: 12 December 1927
- Location: Stora torget, Linköping, Sweden
- Interactive map of Folkungabrunnen
- Coordinates: 58°24′39″N 15°37′17″E

Folkungabrunnen (lit. 'The Folkung Fountain') is a fountain at Stora torget in Linköping, Sweden. Designed by the sculptor Carl Milles, it has a rectangular basin where the outsides are covered with reliefs showing subjects from the history of Östergötland. At the centre is an equestrian bronze statue of Folke Filbyter, the semi-legendary progenitor of the medieval Folkung dynasty, as he is portrayed in the 1905 novel Folke Filbyter by Verner von Heidenstam. Milles depicted a moment from the novel where the aged Folke searches for his lost grandchild and his horse slides on slippery stones while crossing a brook.

The monument was primarily financed by Henric Westman. It was inaugurated on 12 December 1927 in the presence of Westman, Milles, Heidenstam and a large crowd of local residents. The statue of the strange-looking man on a skinny horse initially caused controversy. Critics were negative to having a statue in such a grotesque style on Linköping's most important square, and thought it was ill-fitting to showcase an unhealthy horse in a province famous in Sweden for its horse breeding. Over time, Folkungabrunnen became popular among Linköping's residents and has become a symbol for the city. It underwent renovation in 2026 to be in good condition for its 100th anniversary in 2027.

There is a reproduction of the Folke Filbyter statue at Millesgården in Stockholm.
