= Ruth Milles =

Swedish sculptor, writer (1873–1941)

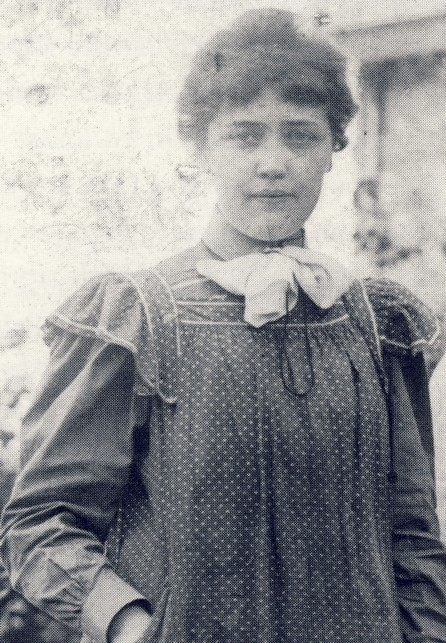
- Ruth Milles in the 1890s
- Born: Ruth Anna Maria Andersson; April 19, 1873; Vallentuna, Sweden
- Died: February 11, 1941 (aged 67); Rome, Italy
- Resting place: Protestant Cemetery, Rome; 41.876°N 12.480°E
- Education: Technical School; Royal Institute of Art; Académie Colarossi; École des Beaux-Arts
- Known for: Figurines
- Notable work: Marble bust of Jenny Lind
- Style: Impressionism
- Movement: Realism

Ruth Milles (19 April 1873 – 11 February 1941) was a Swedish sculptor and writer. She is mainly known for her figurines and reliefs.

== Early life and education ==
Milles was born Ruth Anna Maria Andersson on Örby Manor in Vallentuna near Stockholm, Sweden. She was the daughter of Chief Verifier of the brännvin manufacturing in Sweden, August Emil Sebastian "Mille" Andersson (1843–1910) and his wife Walborg Alfhild Maria Tisell (1846-1879). She had two siblings when her mother died in childbirth and gained three half siblings after her father remarried. Her brother was the sculptor Carl Milles (1875–1955) and her half-brother Evert Milles (1885–1960) was an architect. Unlike her brother Carl, Milles was a college educated artist. She studied at the Tekniska Skolan (the Technical School), predecessor to the Konstfack University College of Arts, Crafts and Design in Stockholm in 1892–93, after which she went on to the Royal Swedish Academy of Arts in 1894–98, where she was considered talented enough to skip a year. She would also visit the Theosophical Society which became influential for her future works.

== Career ==
In the autumn of 1898, Milles left for Paris, approximately a year after her brother Carl had moved there. She studied at the Académie Colarossi and École des Beaux-Arts, and used Paris as base for journeys through France and Germany. Milles and her brother spent much time together in Paris where they collaborated, artistically and economically, in a joint company they started. Among other things, the company sold small bronze figurines, depicting children and characters from fairy tales made by her. She spent the summers in the fishing village Briac in Bretagne where she would draw inspiration from the local fishers' life for her sculptures. Her sculptures were made in an early Impressionistic style. While in France, she and her brother changed their surname to Milles after their father's nickname. In 1902, she received an honorary award at the Salon in Paris. The next year she fell ill with tuberculosis. She travelled back to Sweden and settled down in Islinge on Lidingö, where she set up a studio which she sometimes shared with the wife of her brother Carl, Olga Milles (née Granner).

Milles got many commissions from cultural institutions in Stockholm, among them the Royal Dramatic Theatre for medallions and busts of the singer Jenny Lind and the actor Georg Dahlqvist. In 1904–16, she participated in a number of international exhibitions like in St. Louis (1905) and Buenos Aires (1910), where she received silver medals for her work, Rome (1911), the world's fair in San Francisco (1915) and the Swedish art exhibition in Charlottenborg Spring Exhibition, Denmark (1916). However, her failing health forced her to abandon her sculpturing and she turned first to painting and later to writing instead. She also made illustrations for books, her own and those of other writers.

In 1932, she moved to Rome. Her health deteriorated, among other things she contracted gangrene and had one of her legs amputated. Milles died in Rome in 1941 and was buried in the Protestant Cemetery, Rome.

Milles is represented in the Nationalmuseum and the Thiel Gallery. There is also a bust and a painting by her in the home (Strand by lake Vättern) of Ellen Key.

== Sculptures – a selection ==
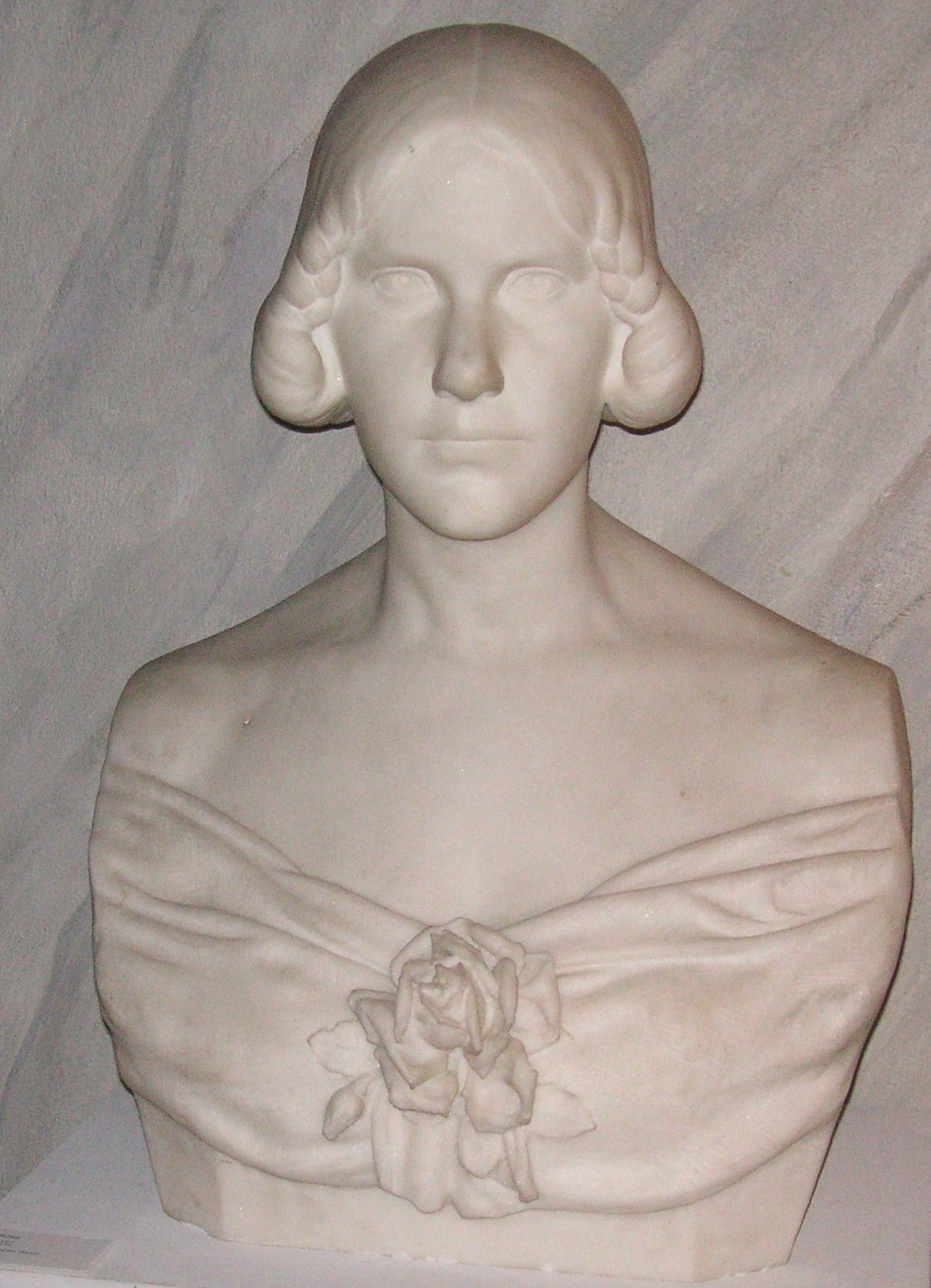
Marble bust of singer Jenny Lind, about 1915

- Blåsväder ("Windy weather")
- Flitiga Kajsa ("Diligent Kajsa")
- Moder med barn ("Mother and child")
- Flicka med knyte ("Girl with bundle")
- Mjölkflicka ("Milkmaid")

== Publications ==
- Dagarnas grå och blommornas blå ("The Grey of the Days and the Blue of the Dreams") a collection of poems, Nationalförlaget (1918)
- Trollskrattet ("The Laughter of the Troll"), a children's tale, Åhlén & Åkerlund (1923)
- Didrik Flygare ("Didrik the Aviator"), a children's tale, Almqvist & Wiksell (1924)
- Glohit och Glodit ("Looky Here and Looky There"), a children's tale, Svenska andelsförlaget (1926)
