= Vision of Peace (Indian God of Peace) =

Coordinates: 44°56′39″N 93°5′38″W

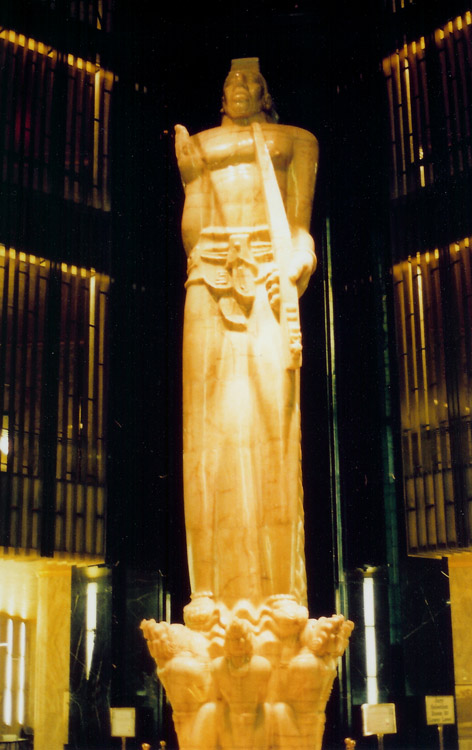
Vision of Peace (Indian God of Peace), Saint Paul City Hall and Ramsey County Courthouse, Saint Paul, Minnesota

The Vision of Peace is a statue in the three-story memorial concourse lobby along the Fourth Street entrance of the Saint Paul City Hall and Ramsey County Courthouse in Saint Paul, Minnesota, United States. The memorial to the Minnesota 20th-century war dead was created by Swedish sculptor Carl Milles, who named it Indian God of Peace. He drew on memories of a Native American ceremony he witnessed in Ponca City, Oklahoma. Although there is no connection between Native American spirituality and his own vision, Milles depicted five Native Americans seated around a fire holding sacred pipes. Emerging from the smoke of those pipes is a "god of peace" which Milles imagined speaking to "all the world.”

Near the base small cased models show earlier proposals of a statue for this space. Included are Saint Paul, the "Father of Waters" representing the Mississippi River, an idealized out of uniform Doughboy, and a left handed version of the final figure.

The statue was unveiled on May 28, 1936, as the Indian God of Peace. Originally there were 340 names to commemorate those who died in World War I. In 1988 the VFW started a funding campaign to add names of Minnesota soldiers who died in combat from other wars such as World War II, the Korean War, and the Vietnam War. There are 1,578 names engraved of those lost to war. Although the sculptor had died in 1955, the statue was renamed Vision of Peace in 1994 at a special community ceremony involving three major Minnesota Native American tribes.

The statue weighs approximately 60 tons, stands 38 ft (11.6 m) high, and was carved from creamy white Mexican onyx using Milles’ full-scale model. The statue sits on a revolving base which goes through a rotation of 66 degrees left and an equal amount right before recentering every 2.5 hours. There are 98 sections fastened to a steel I-beam and supported by three-quarter-inch bronze ribs.

== See also ==
- List of tallest statues
- 20th_century#Wars_and_politics
