= Fountain of Faith =

Coordinates: 38.878°N 77.2004°W

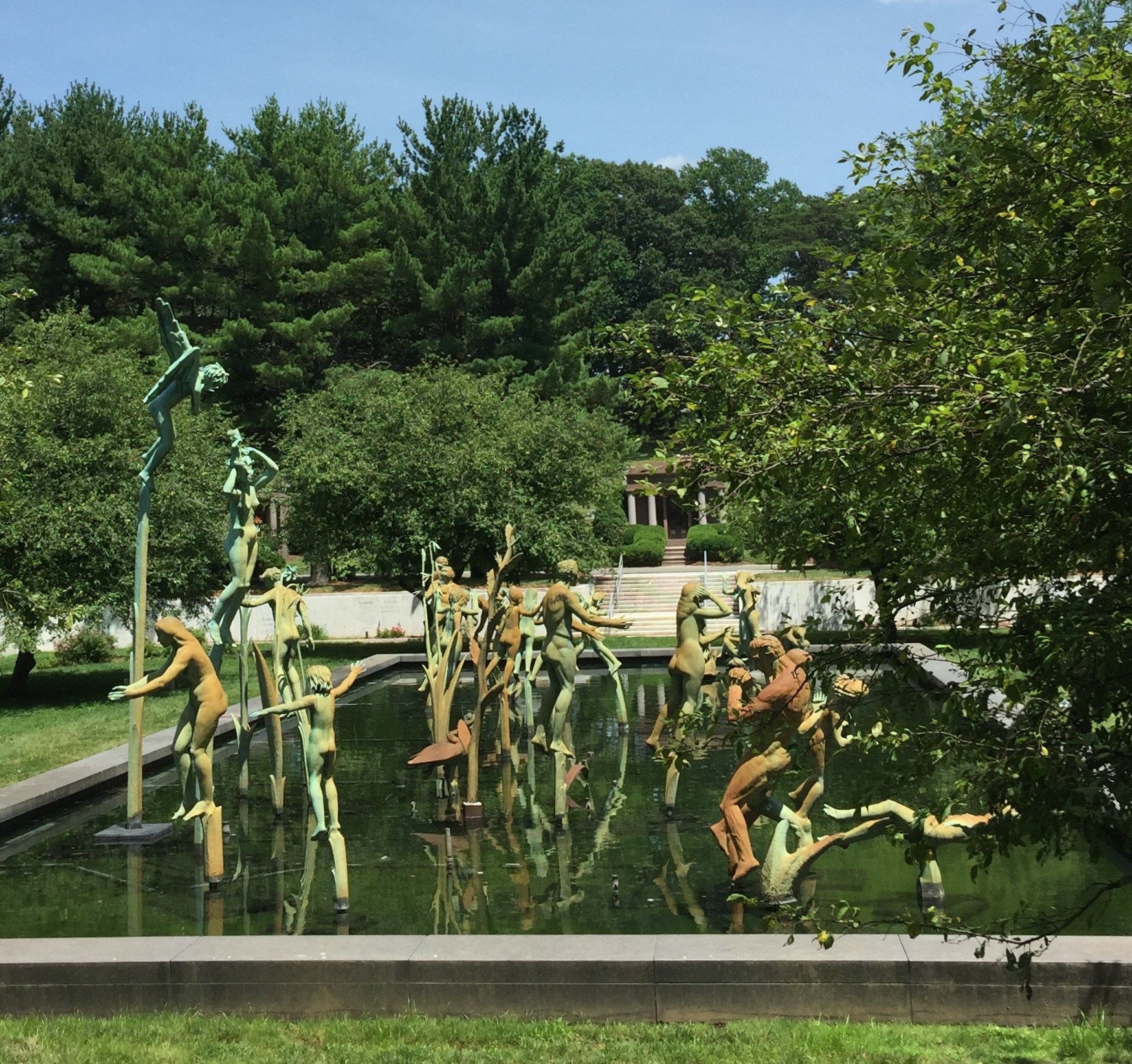
Overview in 2016

The Fountain of Faith is a monumental sculptural group by Carl Milles in Falls Church, Virginia. It is located in National Memorial Park, a large cemetery which also displays a colossal cast of Milles' Sunsinger sculpture. Each of the fountain's thirty-seven life-size bronze figures evokes a specific individual whom Milles had known before their death.

The work was inaugurated in 1952 after 12 years of Milles' work. On that occasion, the National Symphony Orchestra played in front of a crowd of 25,000. Over the years, Milles's dedication to the project had grown so much that he only took payment for four of the figures, not counting the Sunsinger which he also offered to the cemetery's developer Robert F. Marlowe.

== Plaque ==
A sign on the stairs leading to the fountain explains the sculptures' significance:

"In these sculptured figures of the Fountain of Faith, Carl Milles, the great Swedish sculptor, has captured the warmth and tenderness, the joy and strength of supreme love in all human relationships. Rising above the limits of this world, the beauty and hope of reunion after life is here perpetuated in bronze to give us infinite peace. The Fountain of Faith makes us see that we do not walk alone . . . That we all have a part in the bigger scheme of things. Let these figures in this Fountain of Faith remind us that faith is not just for holy days but that faith is for every day. A quiet moment before this great work of art can make us draw closer together, and grant us tranquility for this is the Fountain of Faith."

== Gallery ==
Sculptures of the fountain in 2016

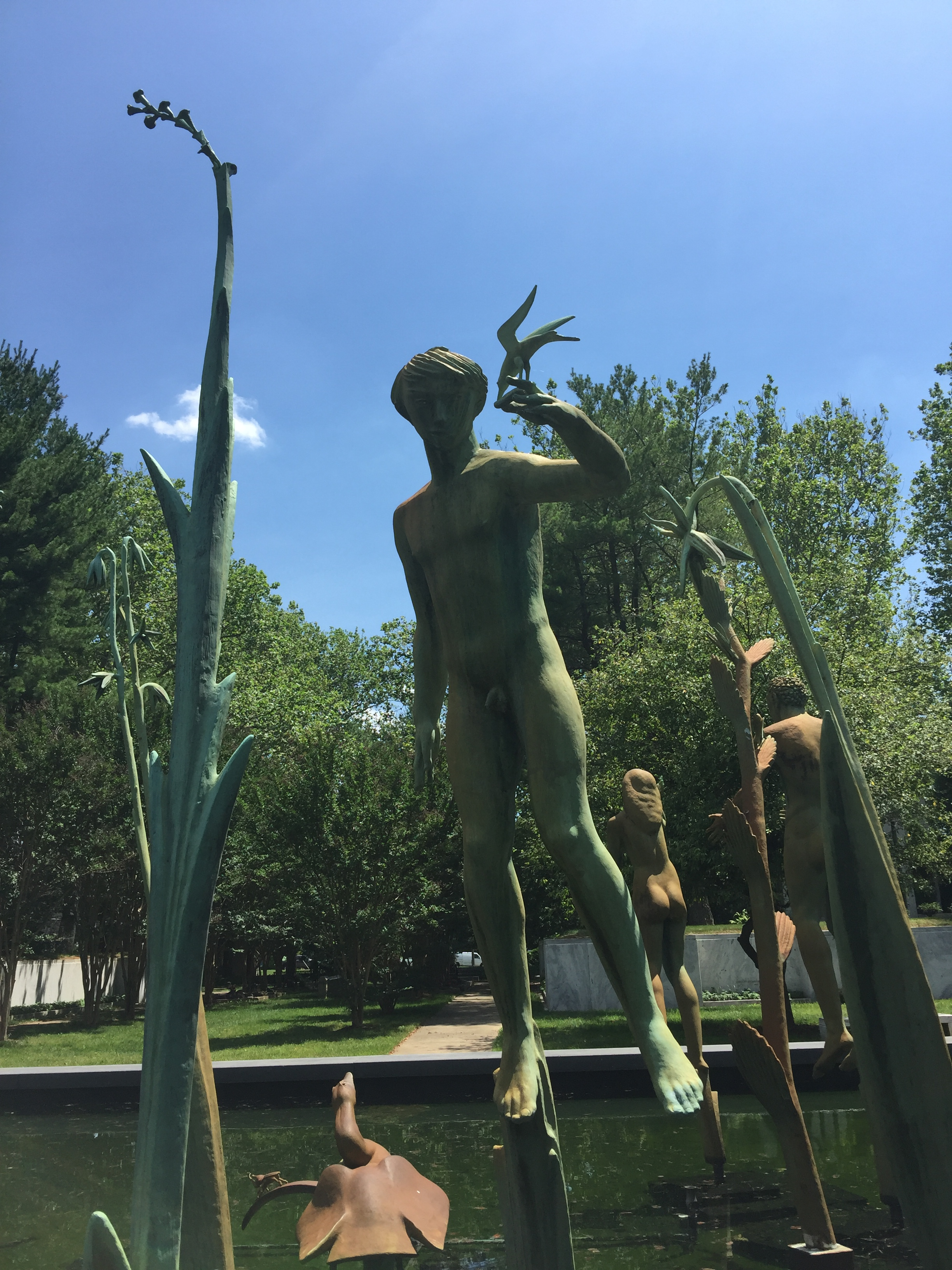
Detail of sculpture

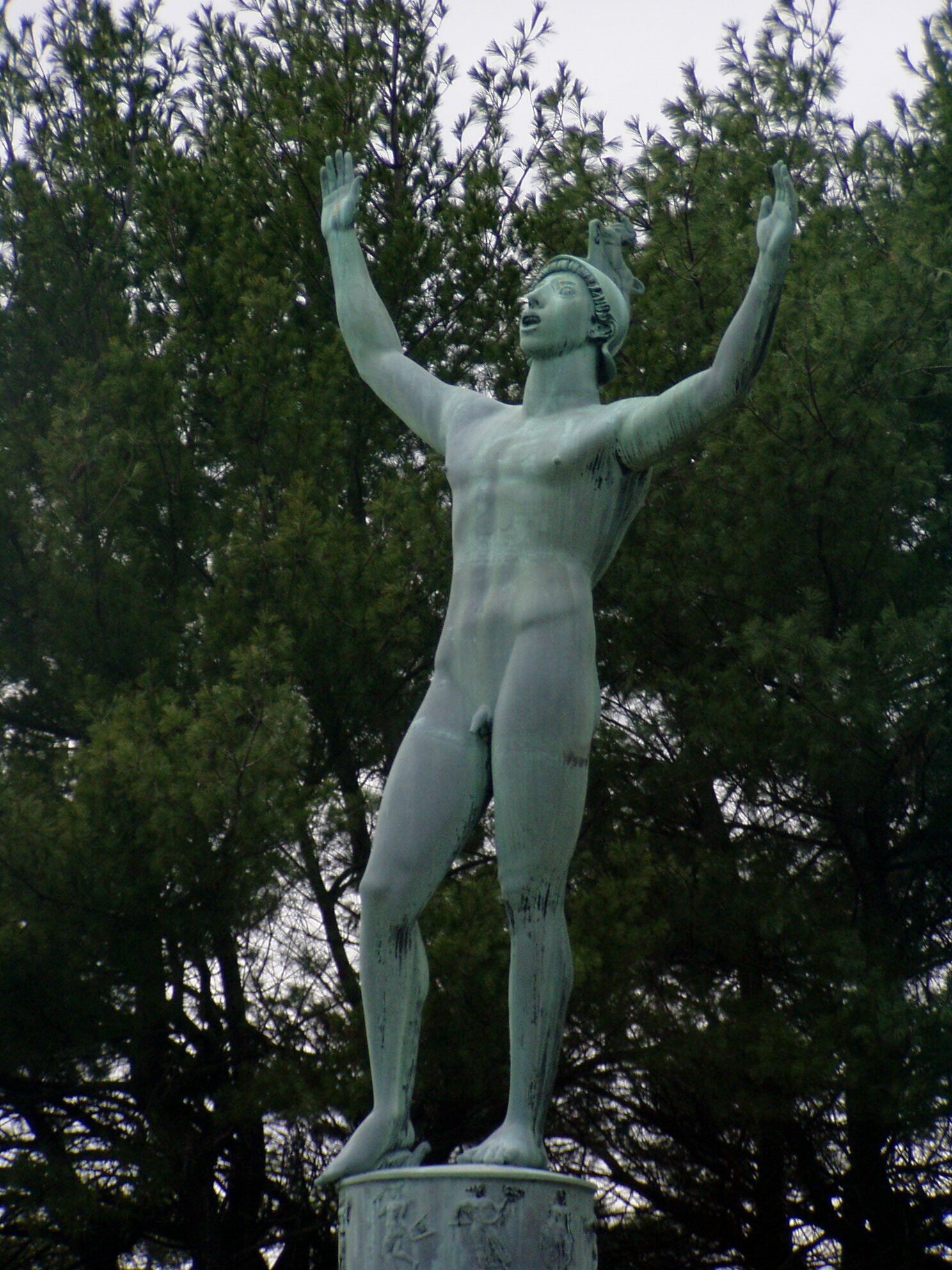
The Sunsinger, also by Carl Milles at National Memorial Park
