= Gärdet metro station =

Stockholm Metro station

Gärdet
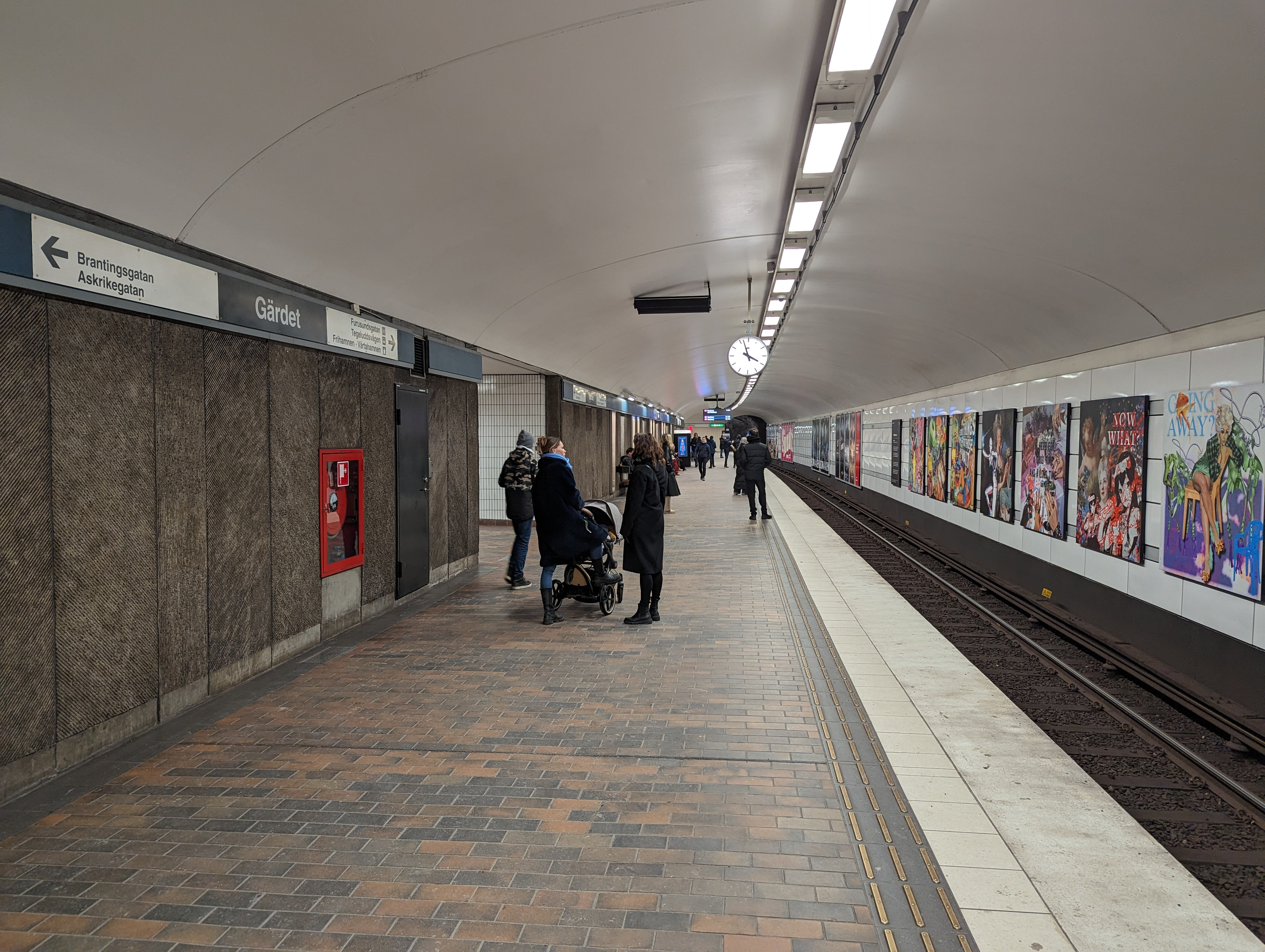

General information
- Coordinates: 59°20′47″N 18°6′7″E
- Elevation: 7.1 m (23 ft) above sea level
- System: Stockholm Metro station
- Owner: Storstockholms Lokaltrafik
- Platforms: 1 island platform
- Tracks: 2

Construction
- Structure type: Underground
- Depth: 22–31 m (72–102 ft)
- Accessible: Yes

Other information
- Station code: GÄR

History
- Opened: 2 September 1967; 59 years ago

Passengers
- 2019: 14,500 boarding per weekday

Services
Preceding station	Stockholm Metro	Following station
Karlaplan towards Norsborg	Line 13	Ropsten Terminus
Location
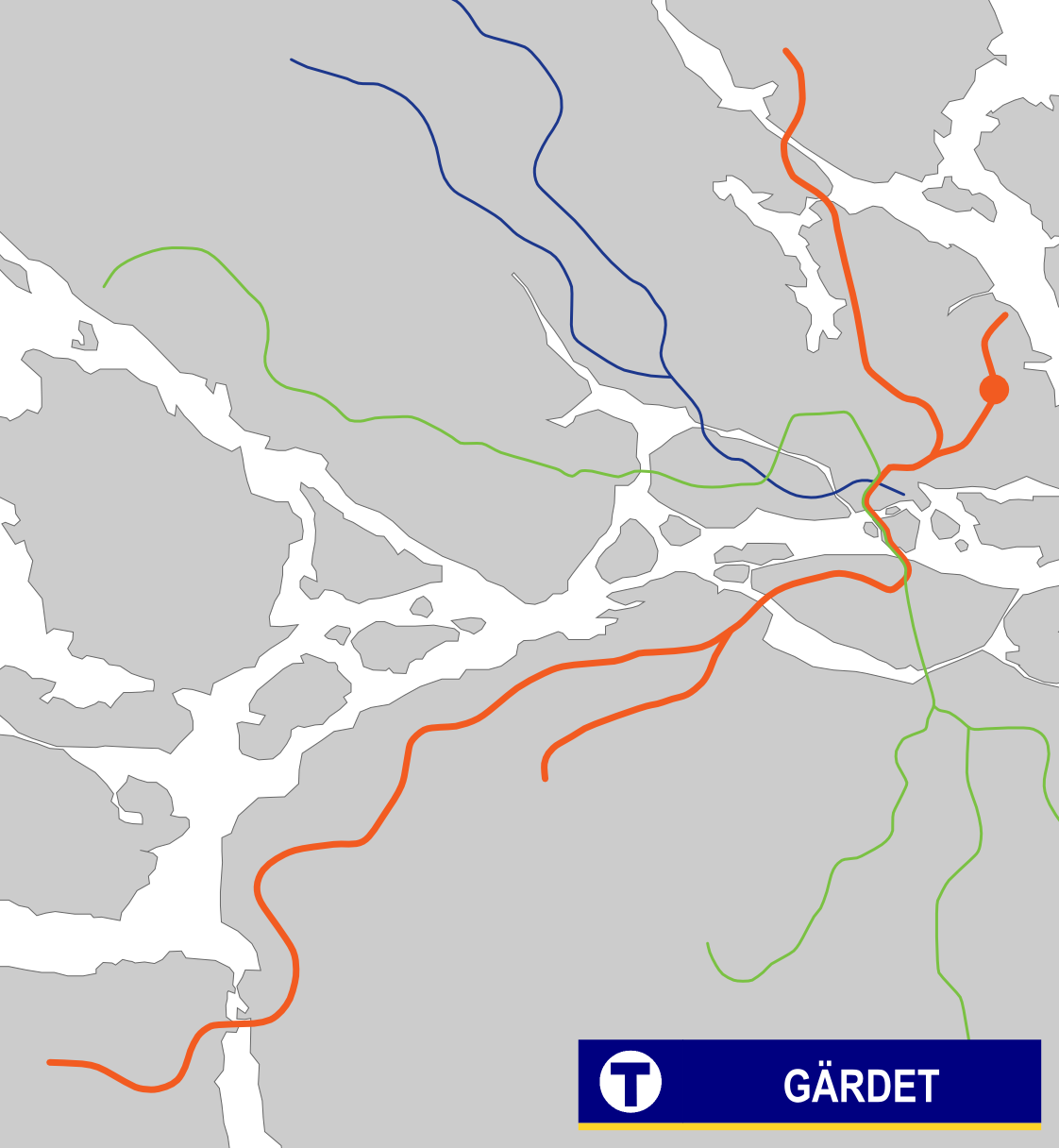

Gärdet is a station on Line 13 of the Red Line of the Stockholm Metro, located in the district of Ladugårdsgärdet. The station was opened on 2 September 1967 as part of the extension from Östermalmstorg to Ropsten.
