= Carl Milles =

Swedish sculptor (1875–1955)

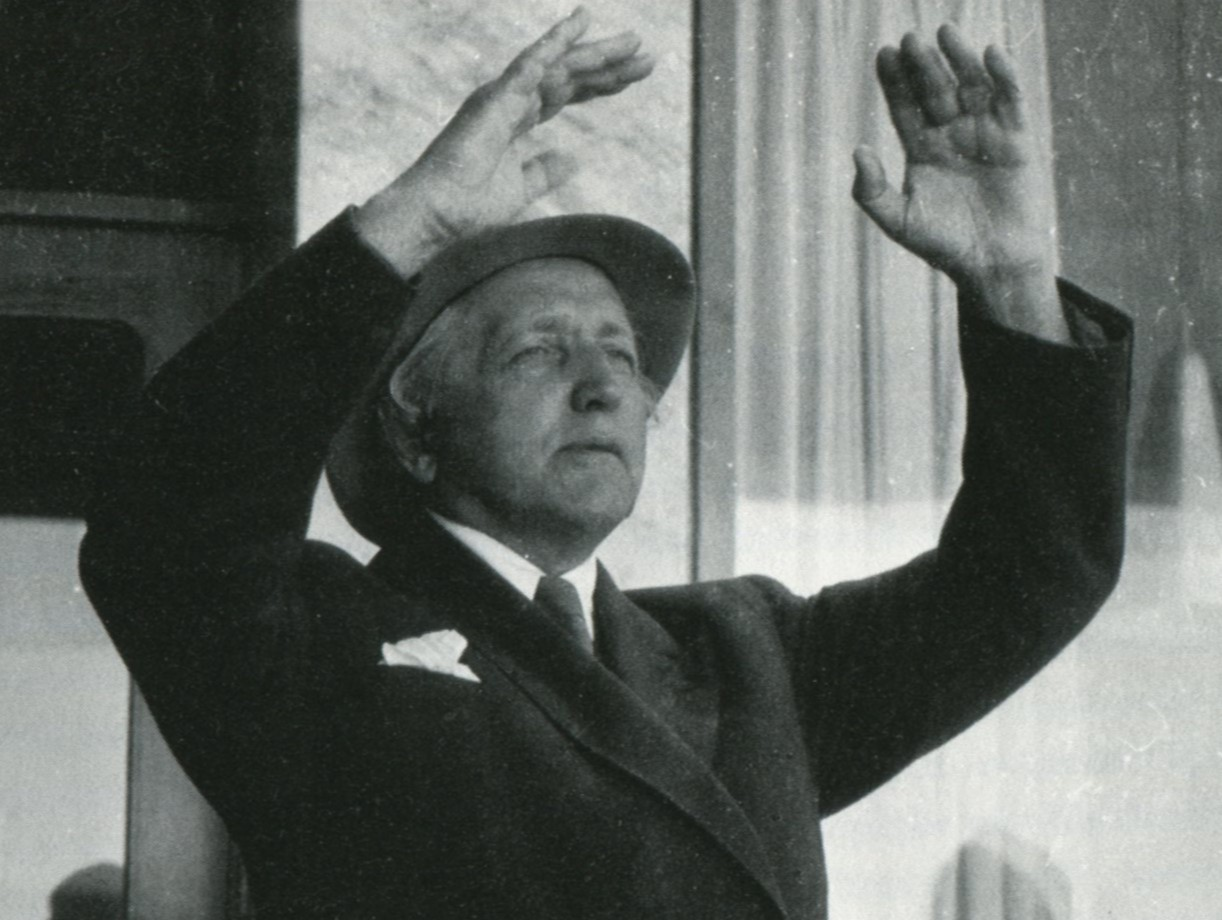
- Milles in the 1940s
- Born: 23 June 1875; Lagga, Sweden
- Died: 15 September 1955 (aged 80); Lidingö, Sweden
- Spouse: Olga Milles

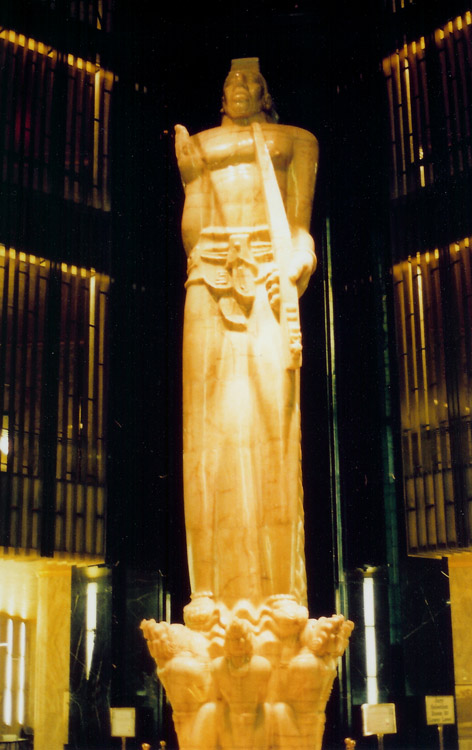
Indian God of Peace, Saint Paul City Hall and Ramsey County Courthouse, Saint Paul, Minnesota

Carl Milles (Swedish pronunciation: [ˈkɑːɭ ˈmɪ̂lːɛs]; 23 June 1875 – 19 September 1955) was a Swedish sculptor. He was married to artist Olga Milles (née Granner) and brother to Ruth Milles and half-brother to the architect Evert Milles. Carl Milles sculpted the Gustaf Vasa statue at the Stockholm Nordic Museum, the Poseidon statue in Gothenburg, the Orpheus group outside the Stockholm Concert Hall, and the Fountain of Faith in Falls Church, Virginia. His home near Stockholm, Millesgården, became his resting place and is now a museum.

== Biography ==
He was born as Carl Wilhelm Emil Andersson, son of lieutenant August Emil Sebastian "Mille" Andersson and his wife Walborg Alfhild Maria Tisell, at Lagga outside Uppsala in 1875. In 1897 he made what he thought would be a temporary stop in Paris on his way to Chile, where he was due to manage a school of gymnastics. However, he remained in Paris, where he studied art, working in Auguste Rodin's studio and slowly gaining recognition as a sculptor. In 1904 he and Olga moved to Munich.

Two years later they settled in Sweden, buying property on Herserud Cliff on Lidingö, a large island near Stockholm. Millesgården was built there between 1906 and 1908 as the sculptor's private residence and workspace. It was turned into a foundation and donated to the Swedish people in 1936.

In 1931, American publisher George Gough Booth brought Milles to Cranbrook Educational Community, in Bloomfield Hills, Michigan, to serve as his sculptor in residence. Part of Booth's arrangement with his principal artists was that they were expected to create major commissions outside the Cranbrook environment.

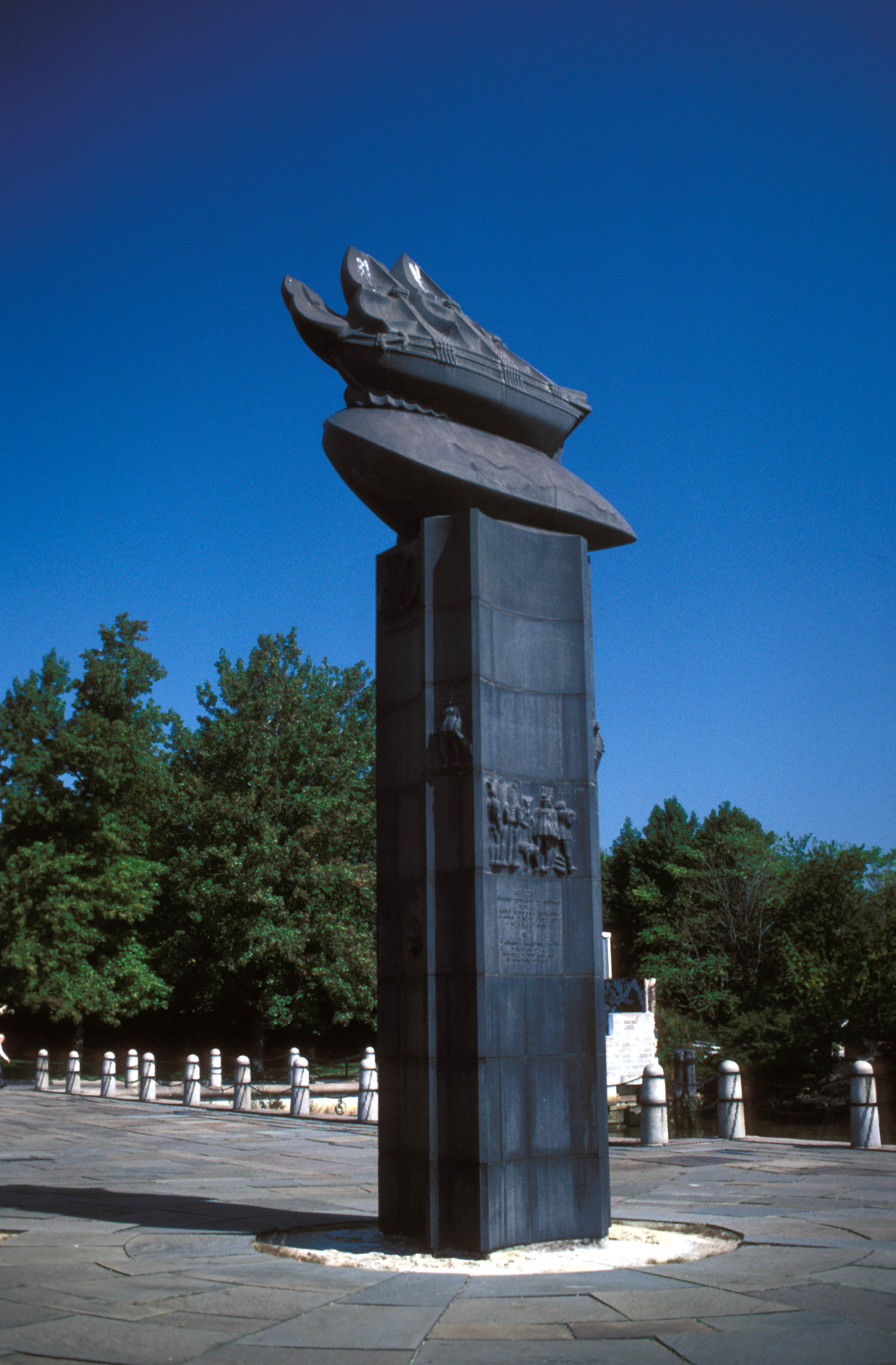
Sculpture at Fort Christina

In 1938, for the 300th anniversary of the founding of New Sweden, the country commissioned a sculpture by Milles featuring a replica of the Kalmar Nyckel, the ship which originally brought the Swedish colonists to America. The sculpture is located at Fort Christina in Wilmington, Delaware, near the landing site where the colonists arrived in 1638.

=== American works ===
In America he is best known for his fountains. Milles's fountain group The Wedding of the Waters in St. Louis symbolizes the Missouri and Mississippi Rivers merging just upstream. Commissioned in 1936 and unveiled in May 1940 to a crowd of about 3000 people, the fountain caused a local uproar because of its playful, irreverent, naked, and nearly cartoonish figures, and because Milles had conceived the group as a wedding party. Local officials insisted that the name be changed to The Meeting of the Waters.

Outside Detroit's Frank Murphy Hall of Justice is a Carl Milles statue, The Hand of God, which was sculpted in honor of Frank Murphy, Detroit Mayor, Michigan Governor, and United States Supreme Court Associate Justice. The statue was placed on a pedestal with the help of sculptor Marshall Fredericks. The statue was commissioned by the United Automobile Workers, and paid for by individual donations from UAW members. The Global Award for Entrepreneurship Research, an annual award for research on entrepreneurship, consists of a replica statuette of The Hand of God and a prize of 100,000 euros. Milles's sculptures sometimes offended American sensibilities, and he had a 'fig leaf' maker on retainer.

Photographs of his sculptures, taken for a monograph on Milles, are now held in the Carl Milles Photograph Collection, c. 1938–1939, in the Ryerson & Burnham Libraries at the Art Institute of Chicago.

=== Return to Sweden ===
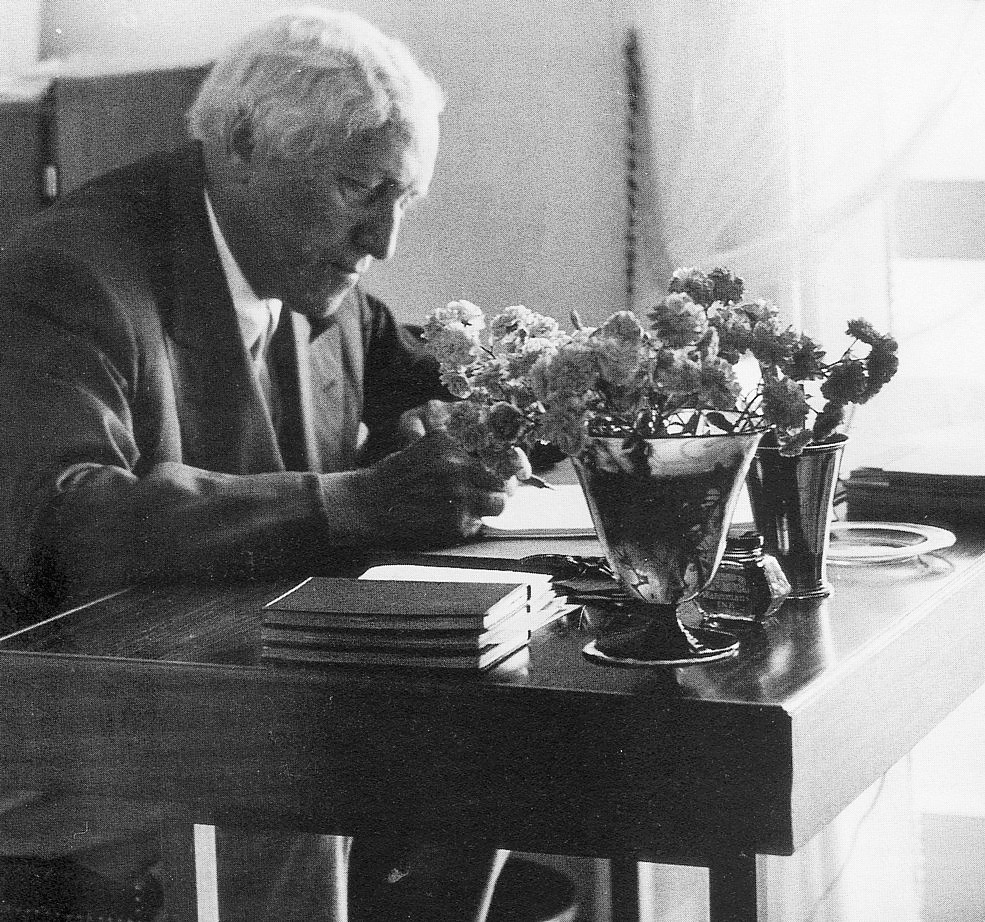
Carl Milles by his desk at Millesgården in 1955

Milles and his wife returned to Sweden in 1951, and lived in Millesgården every summer until Milles's death in 1955. They spent winters in Rome, where the American Academy had supplied them with a studio. Milles and his wife, Olga, who died in 1967 in Graz, Austria, are buried in a small stone chapel, designed by Milles, at Millesgården. Because Swedish law requires burial on sacred ground, it took the assistance of the then reigning Gustaf VI Adolf to allow this resting place.

== Political views ==
Milles expressed admiration for Nazi Germany and Adolf Hitler during the 1920s and 1930s, as well as for Benito Mussolini and Francisco Franco. Carl Milles feared the growing communism and was impressed by the rhetoric of Hitler, Mussolini, and Franco. To his friend Frances Rich, he exclaimed, "I love people who clean up their homes and have Sunday finesse. I don't care what they're called, but I hate disorder ...". To Olga Milles, who remained in Graz for a while after the annexation (Anschluss) of Austria to the German Reich, Carl enthusiastically sent "Heil Hitler" greetings. However, Milles was hesitant about the methods "to clean up." In 1938, he wrote to his sister Ruth: "... but no matter how skillful he (Hitler) is in managing Germany, he rattles too much, but maybe it's the only way to make others understand ...".

Like many intellectuals in Sweden at that time, Milles was also involved in the appeal to the National Association Sweden-Germany. The association was formed in 1937 to show its support for Germany and as a reaction to the Swedish journalism, which mostly took a negative stance towards the growing Nazi Germany. Milles believed that the Swedish press risked dragging Sweden into the war and argued: "The press's ignorant writers, who have fantasized their small brains to disgusting mockery of a great people striving for independence from hunger and communism ...".

Milles had a complex attitude towards Nazi Germany. Many letters are ambiguous, and there are also examples where he opposed German methods. But when he visited Germany, which he did annually throughout the 1930s, the criticism often subsided, and he was swept away by the general pro-Nazi "fighting spirit".

== Selected works ==
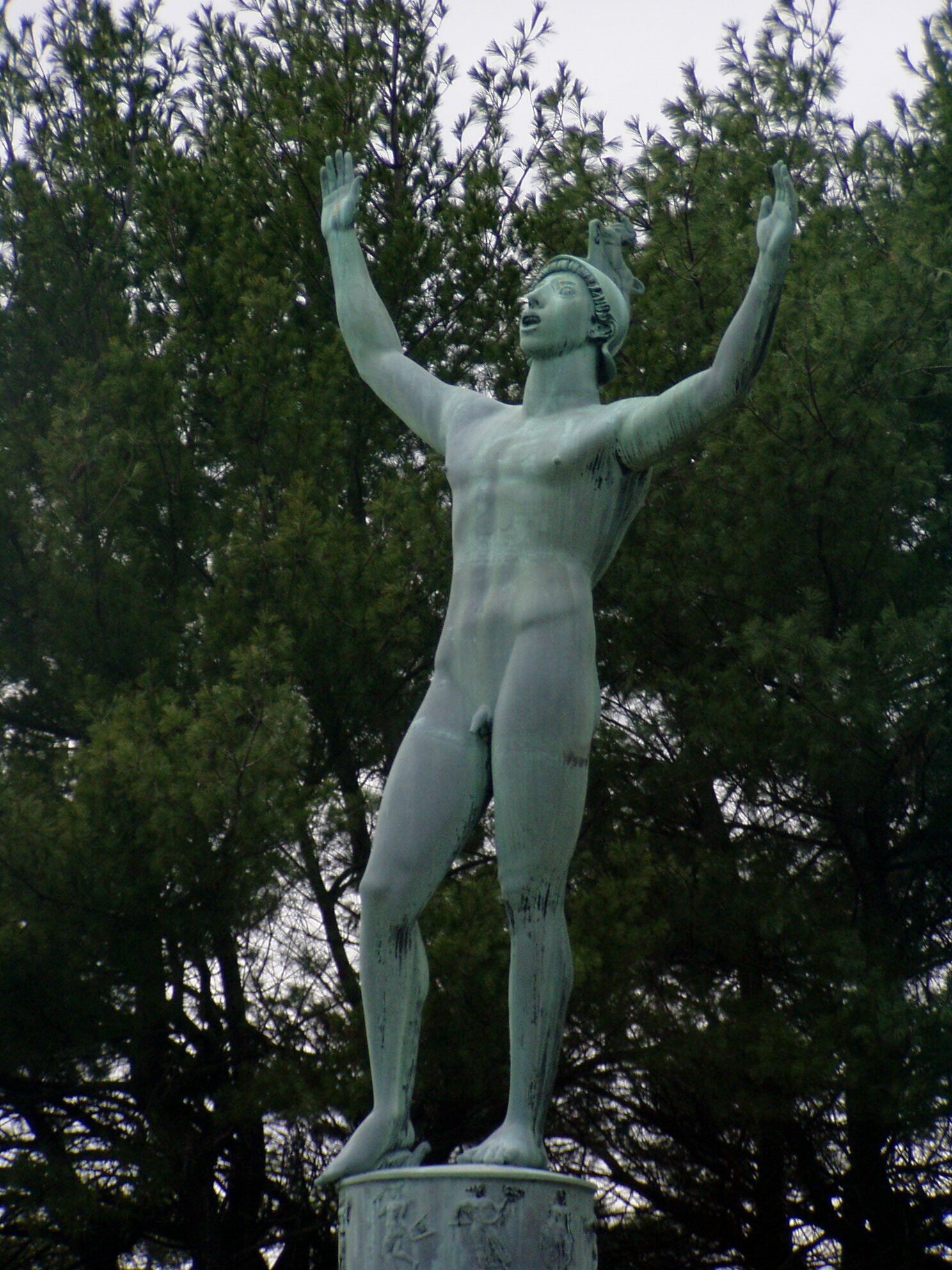
The Sunsinger, National Memorial Gardens, Falls Church, VA

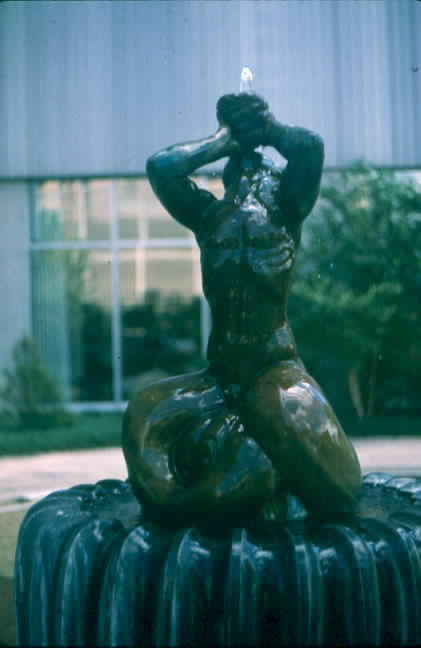
Triton Blowing a Shell, Mayo Clinic, Rochester, Minnesota

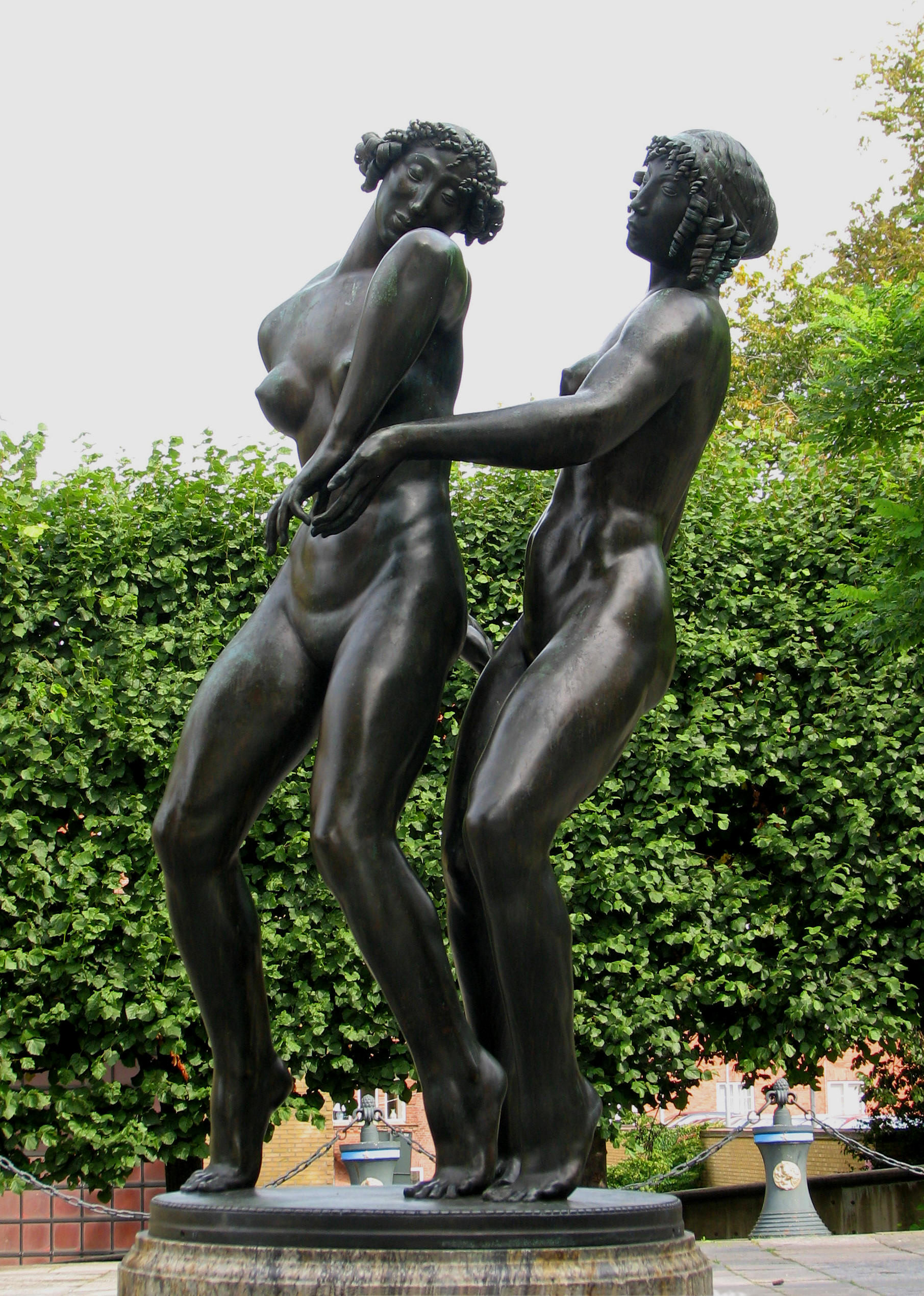
Two Dancers, Götaplatsen, Gothenburg

- Aganippe Fountain, Metropolitan Museum of Art, New York City, 1951–1955 (at Brookgreen Gardens since 1982)
- Aviator Monument, Karlaplan, Stockholm, 1931
- Fountain of Faith, National Memorial Park cemetery, Falls Church, Virginia, 1939–1952
- Gustav Vasa Statue, Nordic Museum, Stockholm, 1905–1907 (painted gypsum) and 1925 (painted oak)
- Folkungabrunnen, Stora torget, Linköping, 1924–1927
- Louis De Geer, Old Square, Norrköping, 1945
- Sten Sture Monument, Uppsala, 1902–1925
- Indian God of Peace, City Hall, Saint Paul, Minnesota, 1932–1936
- Bronze doors, Finance Building, Pennsylvania State Capitol Complex, Harrisburg, Pennsylvania, 1938
- Diana Fountain, Matchstick Palace, Stockholm, 1927–28
- Europe and the Bull Fountain, Stora Torg, Halmstad, 1924–1926
- Exterior sculpted decor of Sweden's Royal Dramatic Theatre, Stockholm, 1903–1908
- God on the Rainbow, Nacka, 1995 (by Marshall Fredericks, on a 1946 model by Milles for the Headquarters of the United Nations)
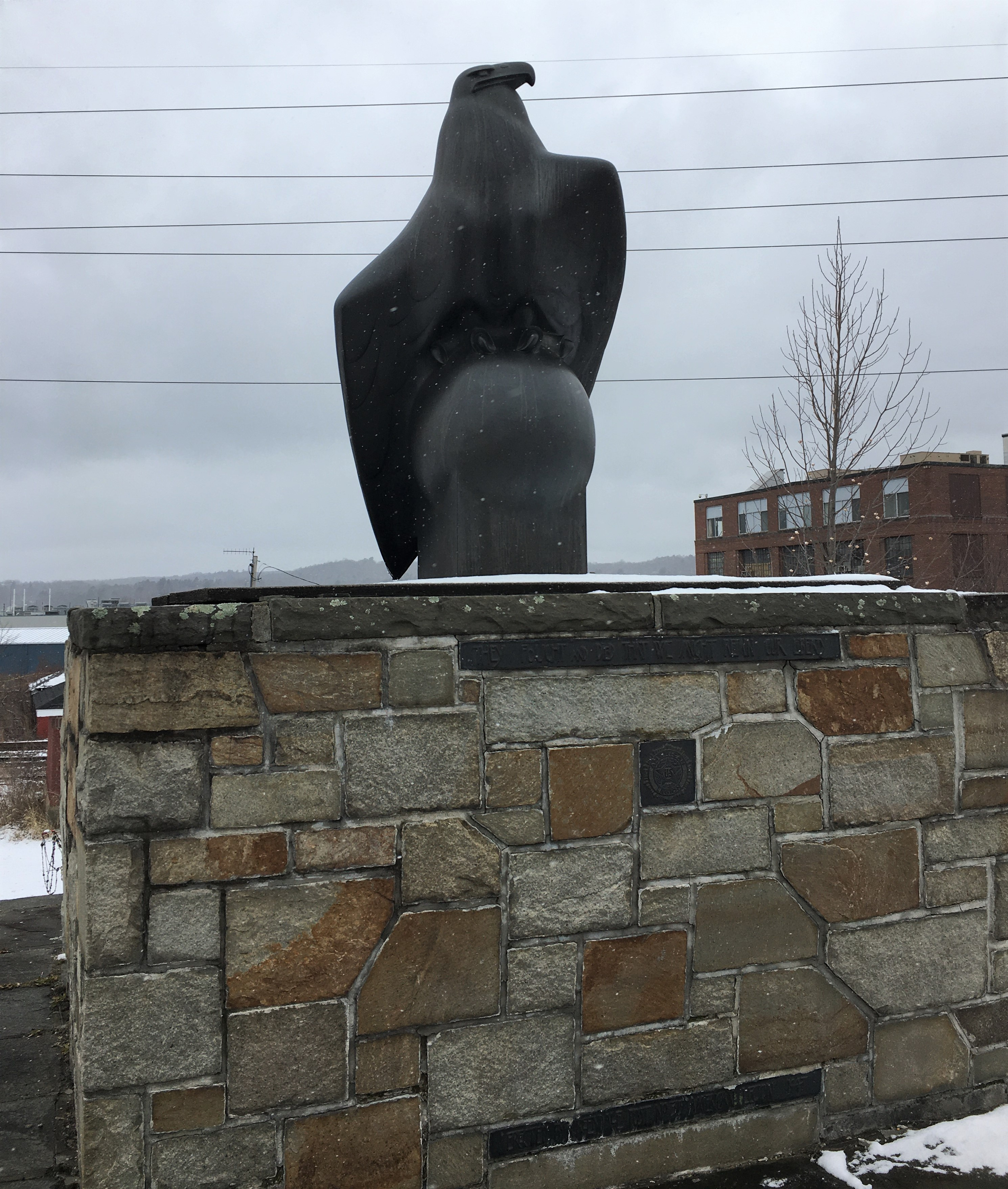
- The Greendale War Memorial on West Boylston Street in Worcester, Massachusetts.
  Greendale War Memorial for Veterans of All Wars, Worcester, Massachusetts, 1948
- Man and Nature, lobby of 1 Rockefeller Plaza, Rockefeller Center, New York City, 1937–1941
- Man and Pegasus, Castle Park, Malmö, 1949
- Maritime Goddess, Helsingborg, 1921–1923
- Meeting of the Waters, monumental fountain, St. Louis, Missouri, 1936–1940
- Monument to Johannes Rudbeckius, Västerås, 1923
- Numerous works at Cranbrook Educational Community, Bloomfield Hills, Michigan, including Mermaids & Tritons Fountain, 1930, Sven Hedin on a Camel, 1932, Jonah and the Whale Fountain, 1932, Orpheus Fountain, 1936.
- On a Sunday Morning, monumental fountain, Ingalls Mall, University of Michigan, Ann Arbor, Michigan, 1939–1941
- Orpheus Group, in front of Stockholm Concert Hall, 1926–1936
- Playing Angels, Philadelphia, Pennsylvania, 1950 (purchased by Fairmount Park Art Association in 1968; installed 1972)
- Poseidon Fountain, Götaplatsen, Gothenburg, 1925–1931
- Saint Martin of Tours (William Volker Memorial Fountain), Kansas City, Missouri, 1950-1955
- Sjöguden (Sea God), Skeppsbron, Stockholm, 1913
- Skrattet (The Laugh), portrait of Janken Wiel-Hansen, Millesgården, Lidingö, 1909.
- Spirit of Transportation, Detroit Civic Center, Detroit, Michigan, 1952
- Sun Singer, Helgeandsholmen, Stockholm, 1926; replicas in Robert Allerton Park, Monticello, Illinois, and National Memorial Gardens, Falls Church, Virginia
- Swedish Tercentenary Monument, Fort Christina, Wilmington, Delaware, 1937–38
- The Archer, in front of Liljevalchs konsthall, Stockholm, 1919
- The Astronomer, 1939 New York World's Fair, Flushing Meadows–Corona Park, 1938–39 (plaster, destroyed at the Fair's end; later reproduced in smaller-scale bronze)
- The Four Ages of Economic Exchange, Stockholms Enskilda Bank head office, Stockholm, 1915
- The Hand of God, Eskilstuna, 1952–1954
- Two Dancers, 1915, placed on Gothenburg's Götaplatsen in 1952
- Two plaques on WWJ Building, Detroit, Michigan, 1936
- Wall reliefs on Racine County Courthouse, Racine, Wisconsin, 1931

== Gallery ==
Carl Milles sculptures

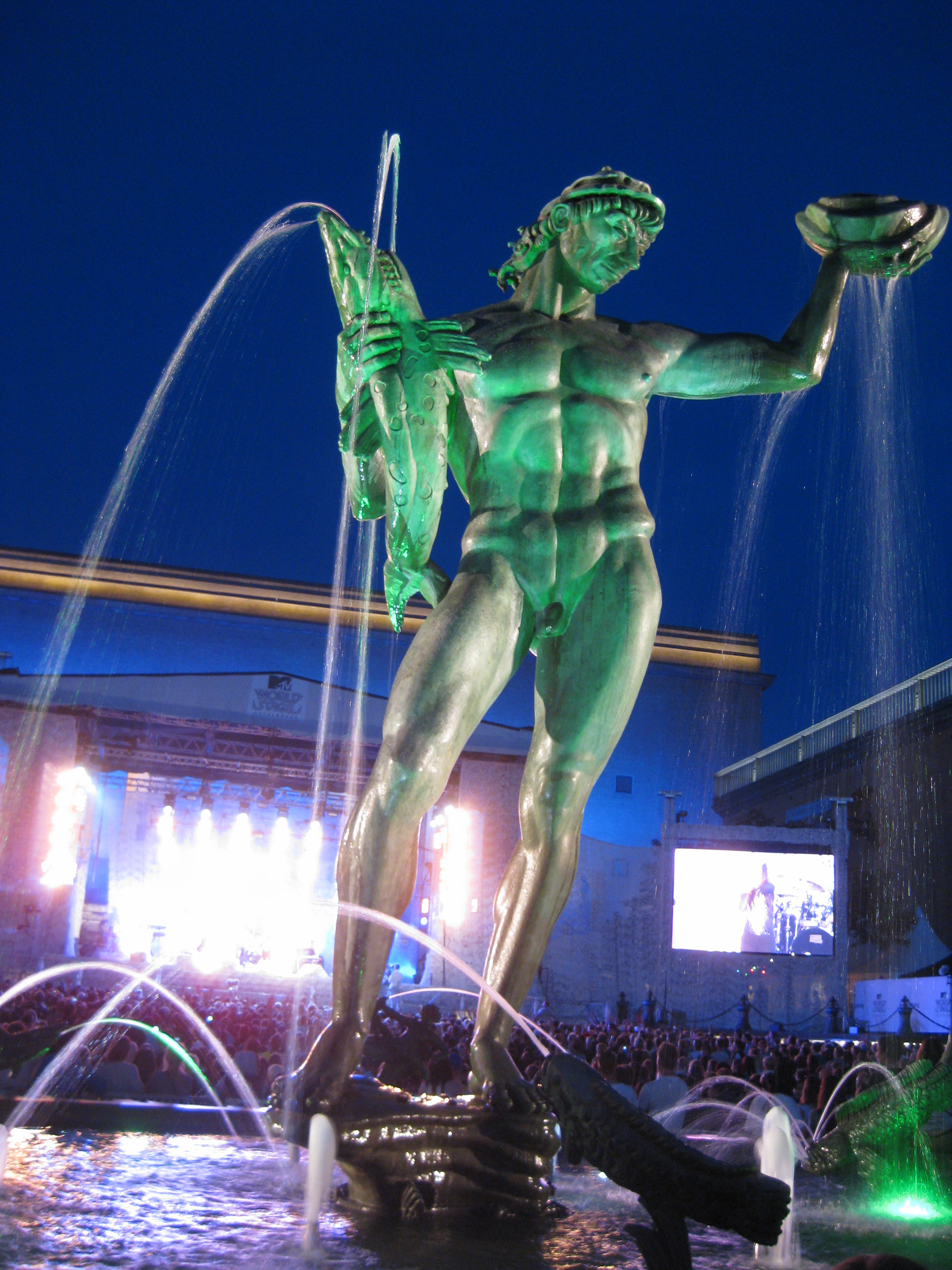
Poseidon, Gothenburg

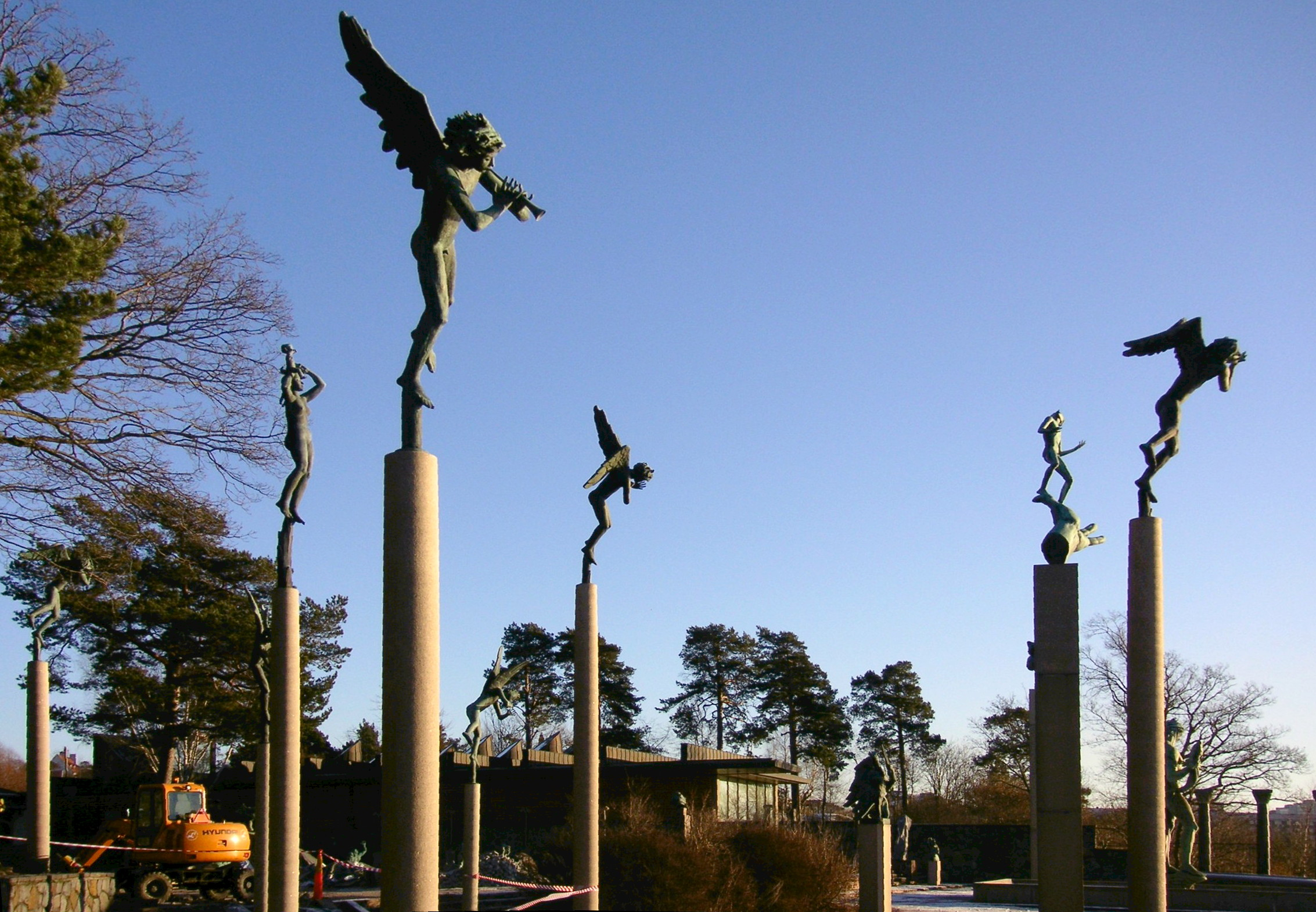
Angels Playing Music, Millesgården, Stockholm

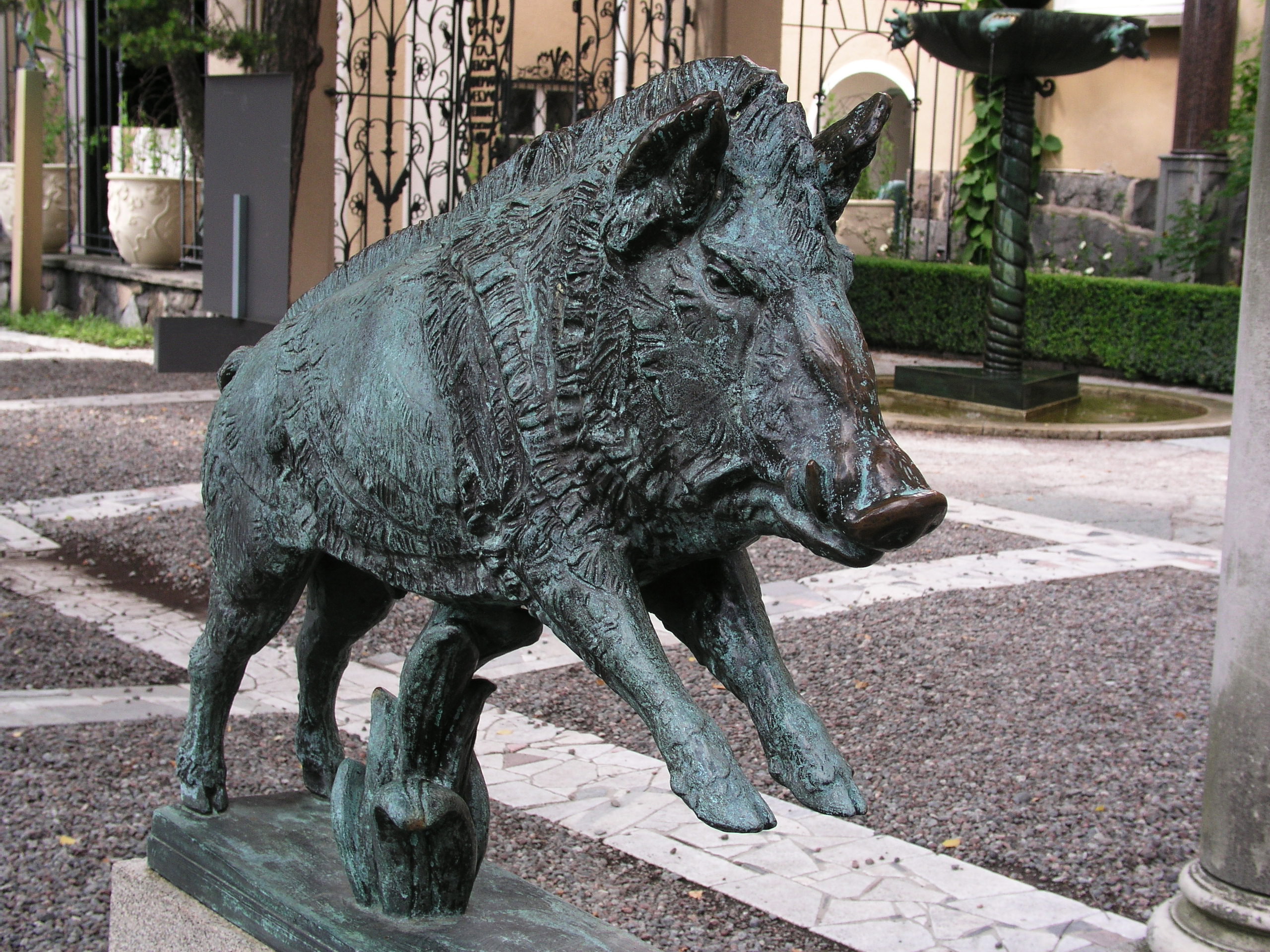
Wild Boar, Millesgården

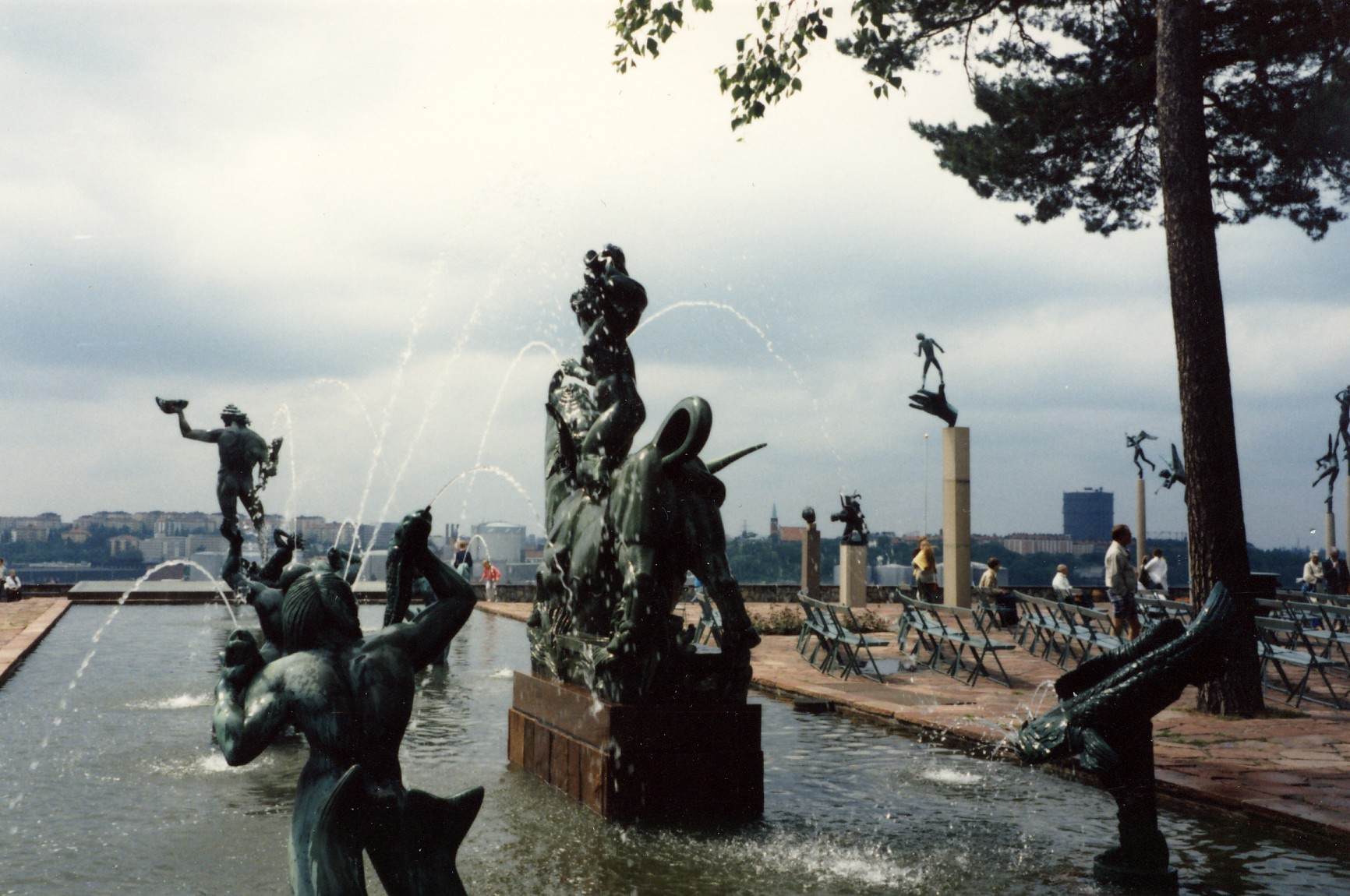
Millesgården

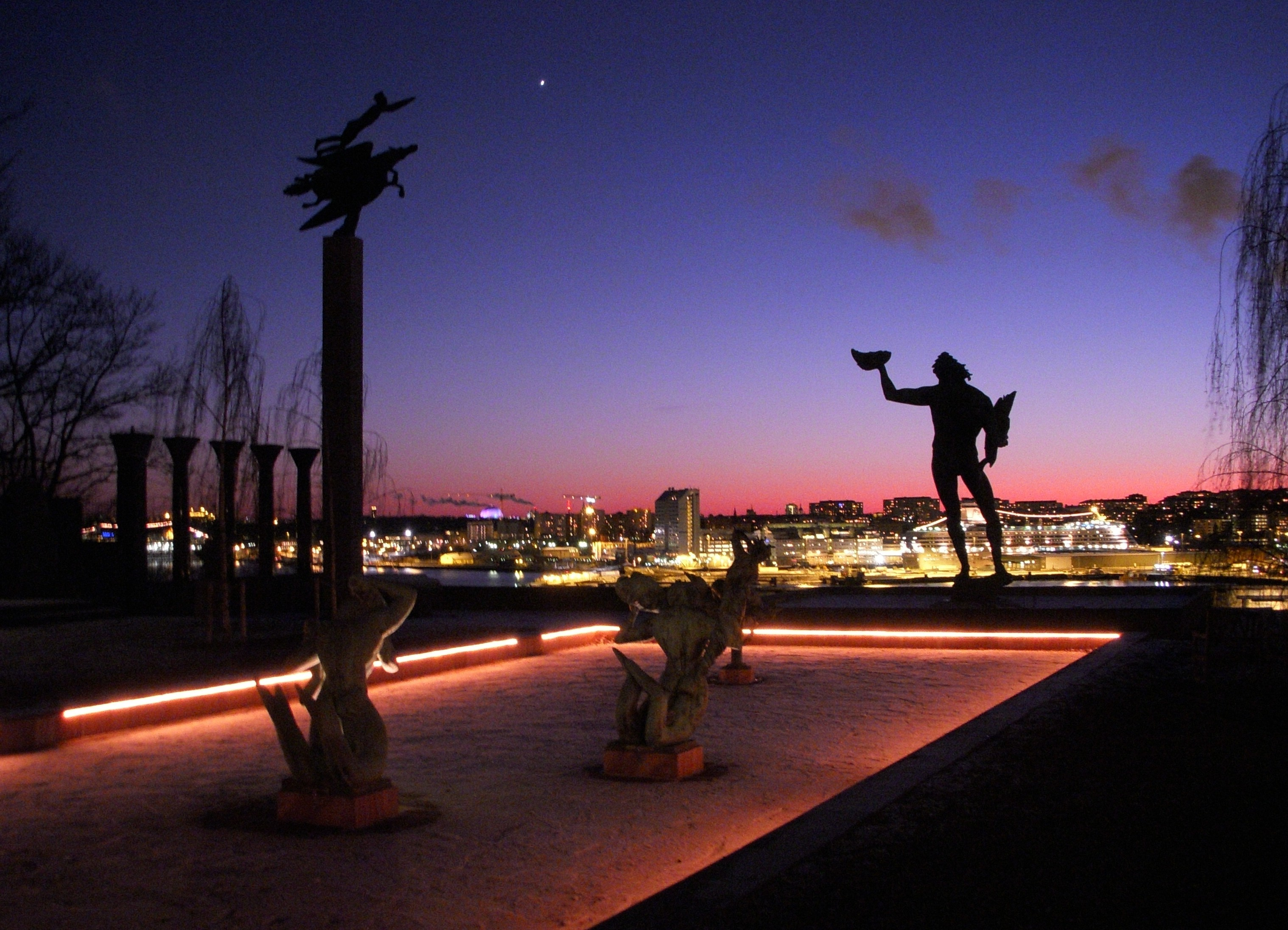
Millesgården

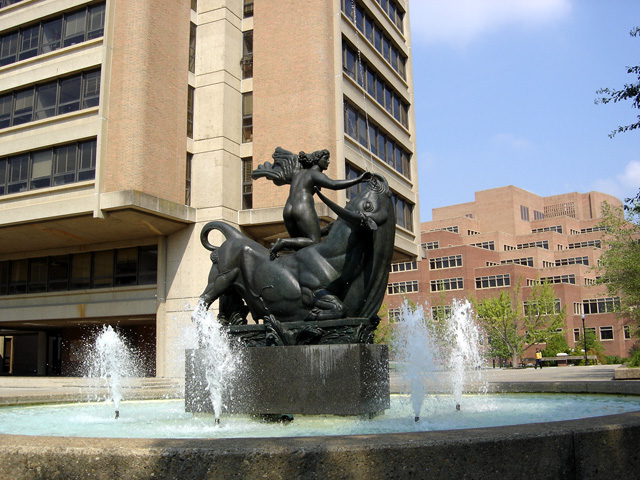
Europa on the Bull, University of Tennessee, Knoxville

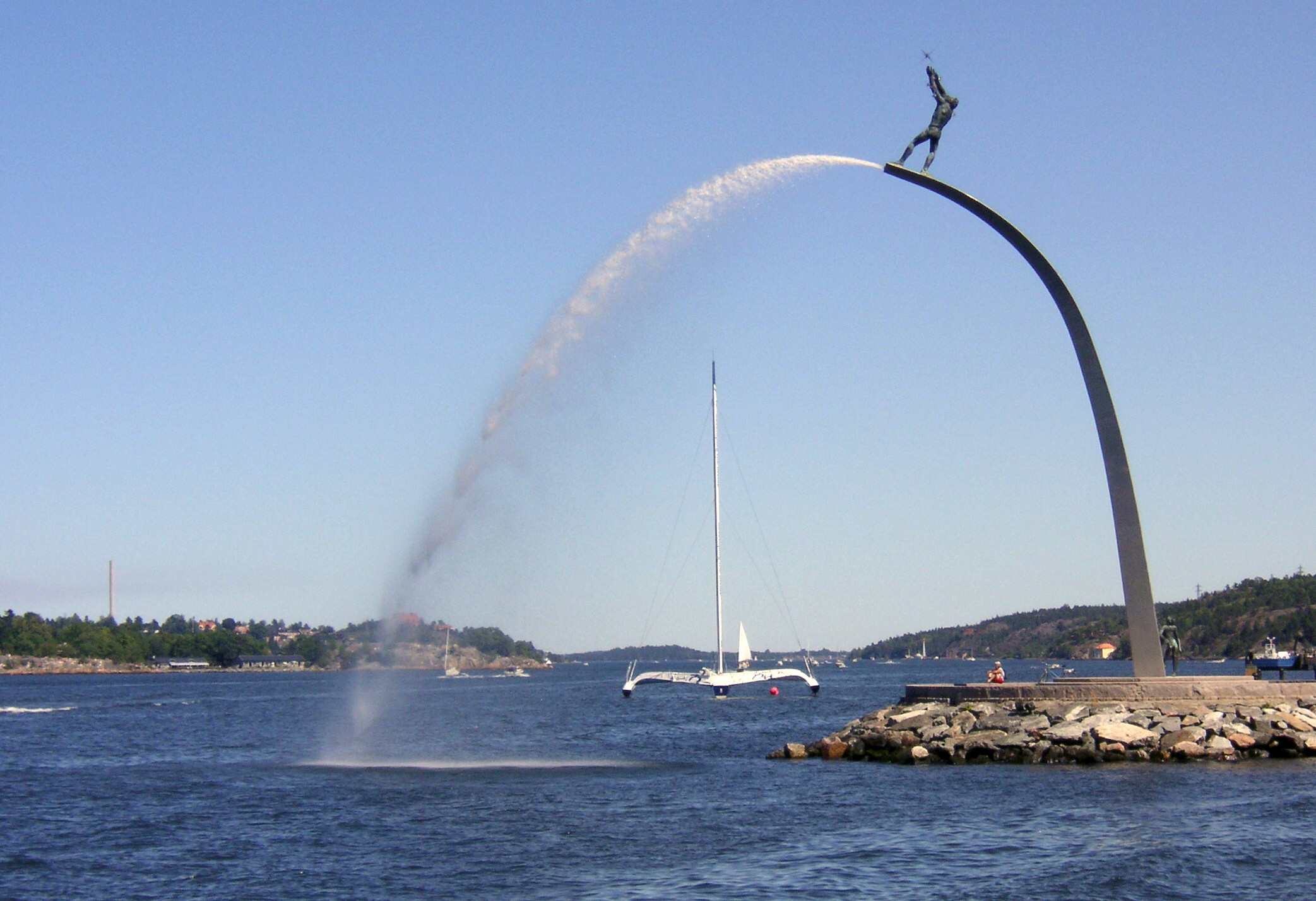
God Father, Nacka Strand, Nacka

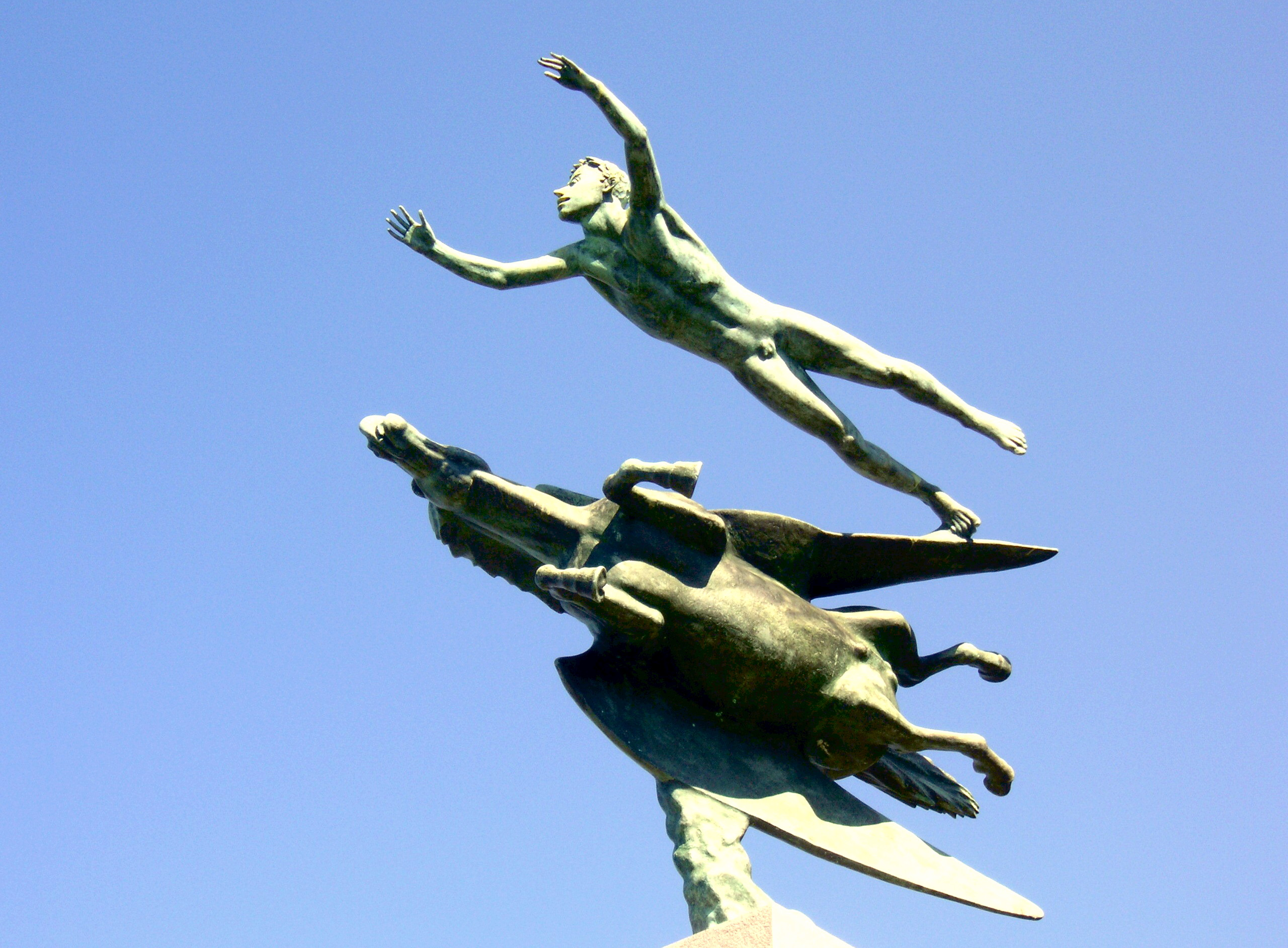
Man and Pegasus, Millesgården

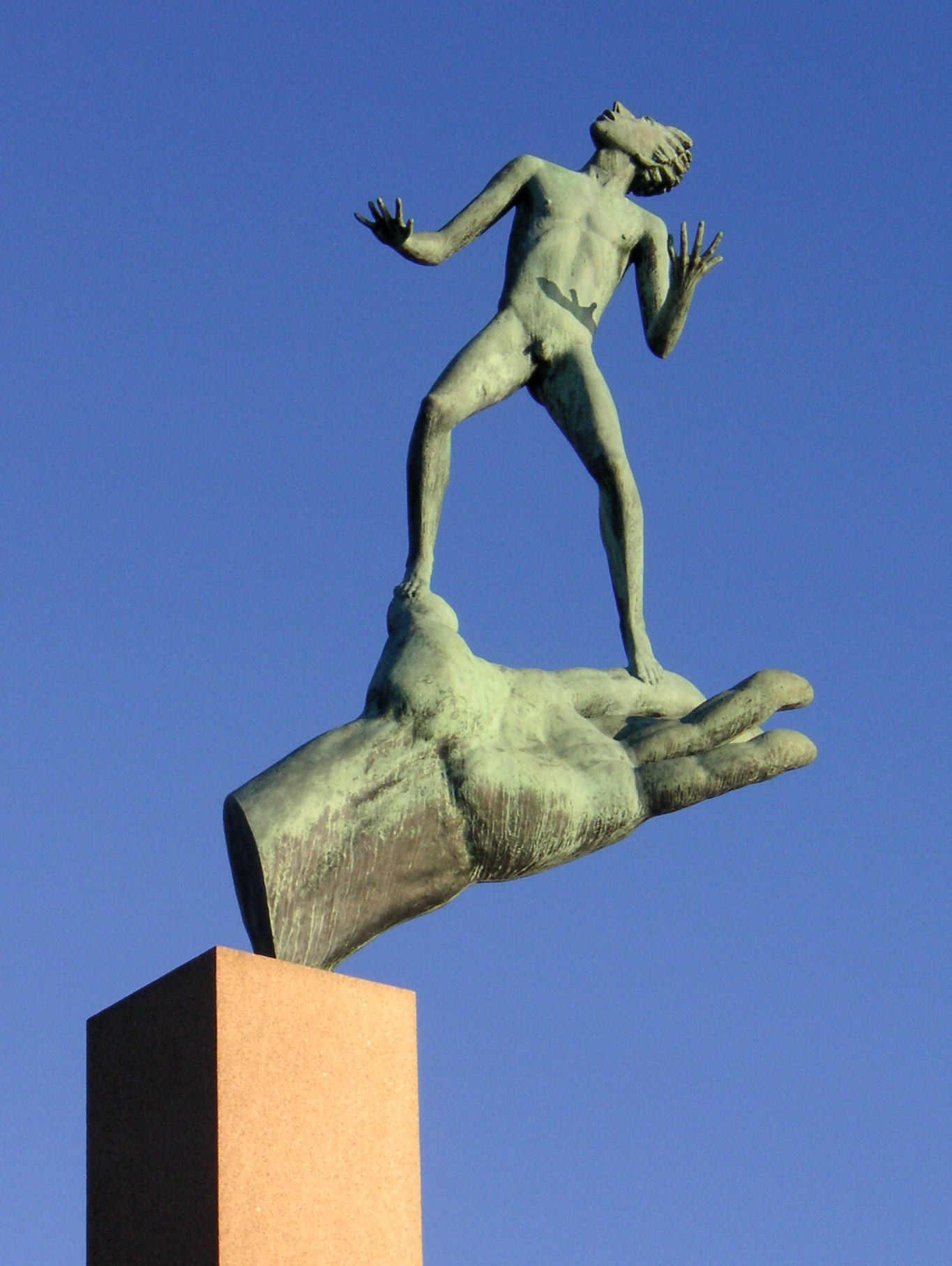
The Hand of God, Millesgården

== Sources and references ==
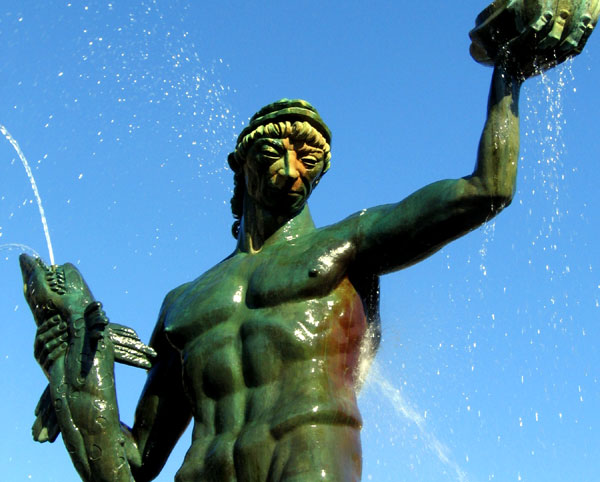
Milles's Poseidon in Gothenburg, Sweden

- Jonsson, Ann, «D’un mythe à l’autre: L’ 'Europe' de Carl Milles et sa symbolique en Suède», in D'Europe à l'Europe, II. Mythe et identité du XIXe s. à nos jours (colloque de Caen, 1999), éd. Rémy Poignault, Françoise Lecocq et Odile Wattel – de Croizant, Tours, Centre Piganiol, coll. Caesarodunum, n° XXXIII bis, 2000, p.157-162.
- Kvaran, Einar E., An Annoted Inventory of Outdoor Sculpture in Washtenaw County (Masters Thesis. 1989)
- Liden, Elisabeth, Between Water and Heaven, Carl Milles Search for American Commissions, (Almqvist & Wiksell International, Stockholm, Sweden 1986)
- Martenson, Gunilla, A Stockholm Sculpture Garden (New York Times, Dec. 27, 1987)
- Nawrocki, Dennis and Thomas Holleman, Art in Detroit Public Places, (Wayne State University Press, Detroit, Michigan 1980)
- Piland & Uguccioni, Fountains of Kansas City, (City of Fountains Foundation 1985)
- Rogers, Meyric, Carl Milles, An Interpretation of His Work, (Yale University Press, New Haven, Connecticut 1940)
- Taylor, Askew, Croze, et al., Milles At Cranbrook, (Cranbrook Academy of Art, 1961)
- Westbrook, Adele and Anne Yarowsky, Design in America, The Cranbrook Vision 1925–1950, (Detroit Institute)

== See also ==
- Marshall Fredericks
