= Gärdet =

Urban district in Stockholm, Sweden

Coordinates: 59.3407°N 18.0961°E

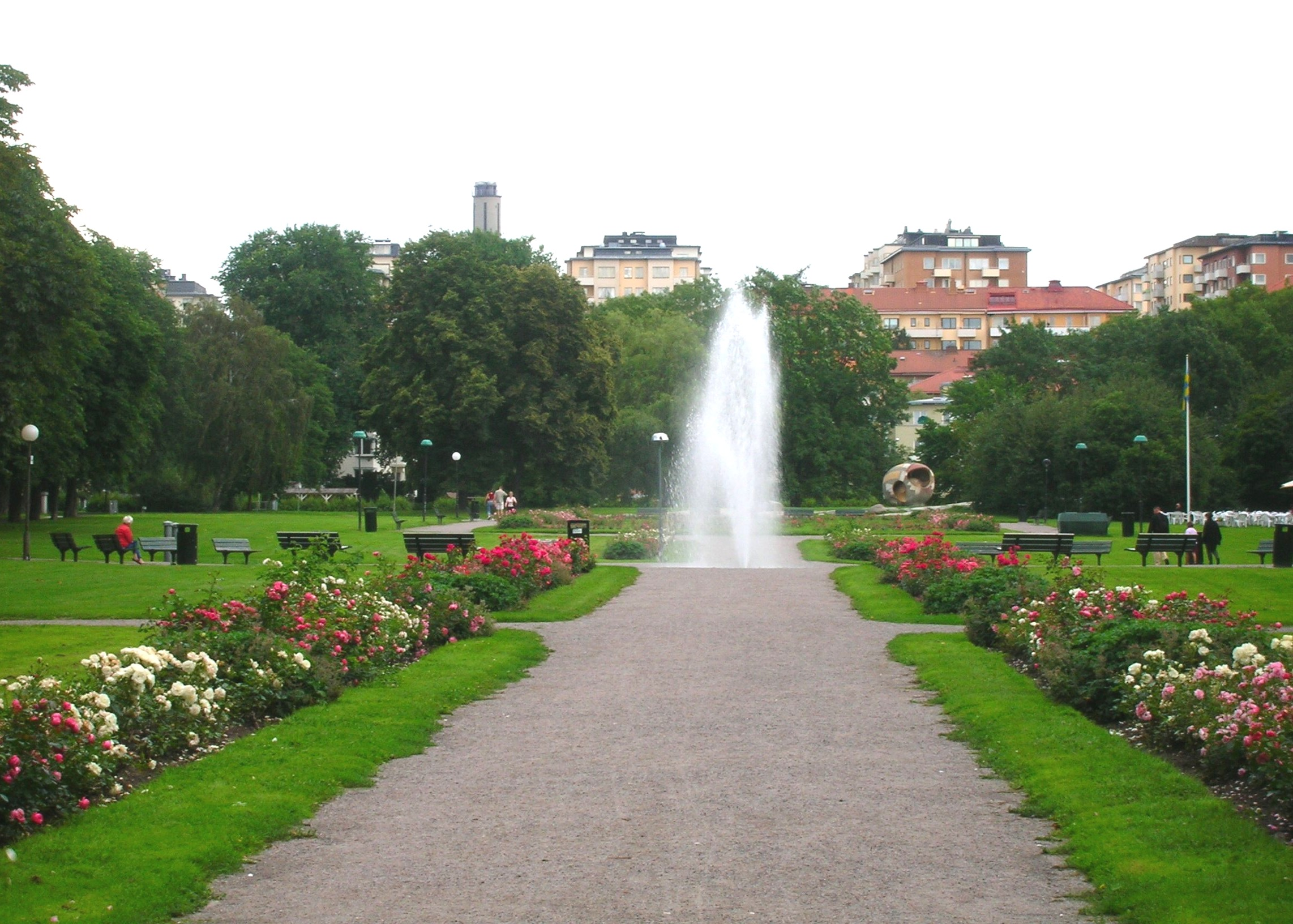
Fountain, Tessinparken (Tessin Park)

Gärdet is a part of Stockholm, Sweden, east and northeast of Östermalm. Its official name is Ladugårdsgärdet. It is renowned for its large number of modernist apartments. Housing about 10,000 people, Gärdet is one of the largest residential districts built in Stockholm, built from 1929 until around 1950. The district includes a vast open space used for recreational purposes; the name Gärdet (lit. 'The Field') often refers to this area specifically. During the summer semester, there are several different events on the field such as circus, music (notably Lollapalooza), sports, and more.

All the buildings around Tessinparken were built between 1932 and 1937.

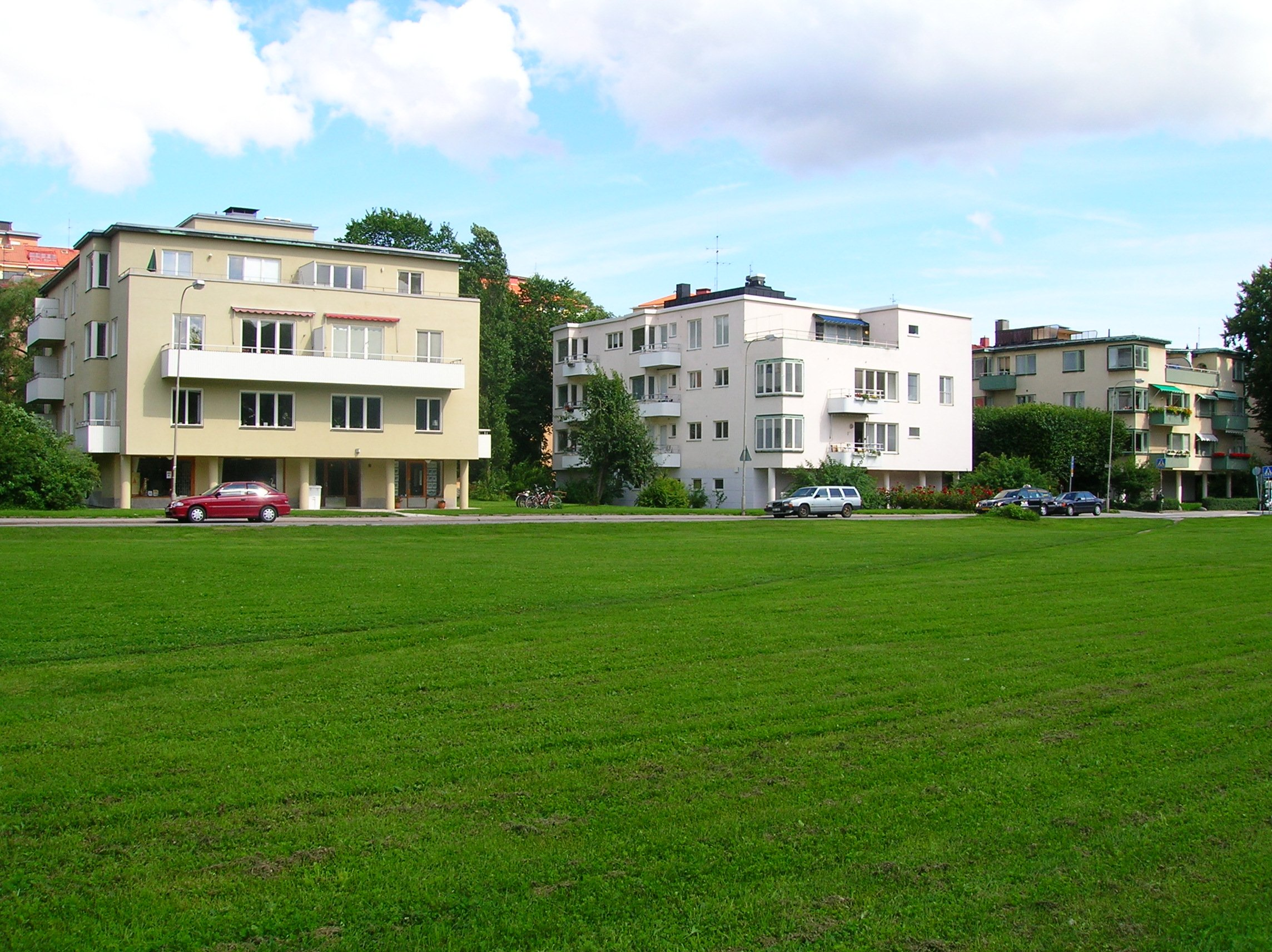
Modernist apartment buildings dating from the late 1930s

== Public transport ==
- Gärdet metro station (Red Line)
