= Karlaplan metro station =

Stockholm Metro station

Karlaplan
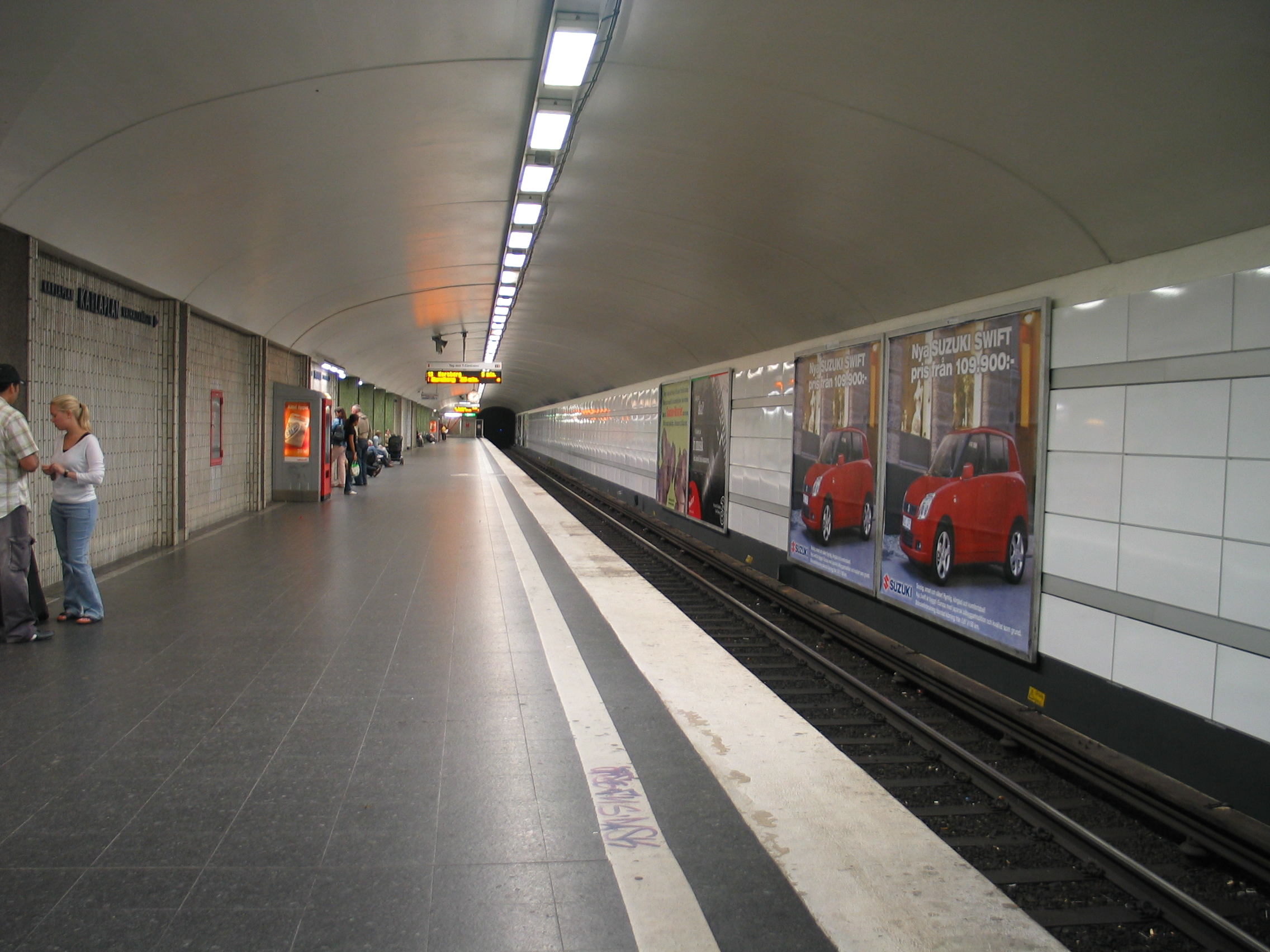

General information
- Coordinates: 59°20′19″N 18°5′26″E
- Elevation: 10.6 m (35 ft) below sea level
- System: Stockholm Metro station
- Owner: Storstockholms Lokaltrafik
- Platforms: 1 island platform
- Tracks: 2

Construction
- Structure type: Underground
- Depth: 23 m (75 ft)
- Accessible: Yes

Other information
- Station code: KAP

History
- Opened: 2 September 1967; 59 years ago

Passengers
- 2019: 17,650 boarding per weekday

Services
Preceding station	Stockholm Metro	Following station
Östermalmstorg towards Norsborg	Line 13	Gärdet towards Ropsten
Location
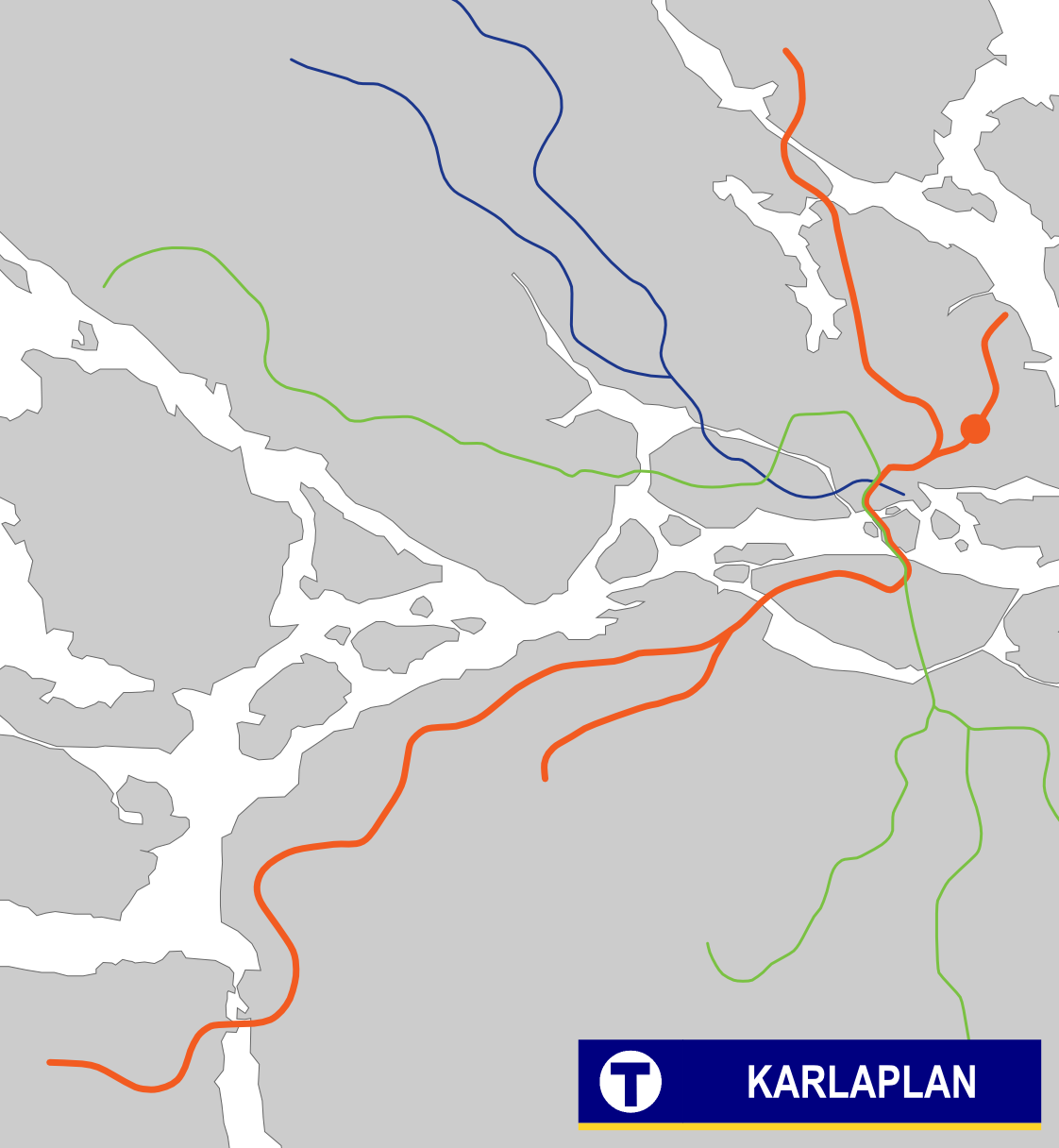

Karlaplan is a station on Line 13 of the Red Line of the Stockholm Metro, located by Karlaplan park in the district of Östermalm. The station was opened on 2 September 1967 as part of the extension from Östermalmstorg to Ropsten.
