= Backstrom =

Bäckström and Backström are Swedish surnames, etymologically distinct from one another, and sometimes anglicized to Beckstrom or Backstrom.

Bäckström means "creak stream". Backström means "downhill stream".

Notable people with the name include:

- Anders Bäckström (born 1960), Swedish ice hockey player
- Daffin Backstrom (1916–1993), American football, basketball, and baseball player and coach
- Fia Backström (born 1970), Swedish artist
- Gustav Backström (born 1995), Swedish ice hockey player
- Henry Backstrom (1897–1987), American politician
- Ina Bäckström (born 1987), Swedish video game developer
- Ingrid Backstrom (born 1978), American skier
- Joakim Bäckström (born 1978), Swedish golfer
- Lars Bäckström (born 1953), Swedish politician
- Monica Backström (1939–2020), Swedish artist and designer
- Nicklas Bäckström (born 1987), Swedish ice hockey player
- Niklas Bäckström (born 1978), Finnish ice hockey player
- Niklas Bäckström (fighter) (born 1989), Swedish mixed martial arts fighter
- Nils Bäckström (born 1986), Swedish ice hockey player
- Ralph Backstrom (1937–2021), Canadian ice hockey player
- Urban Bäckström (born 1954), Swedish economist

== See also ==
- Evert Bäckström, fictional character created by Swedish writer, Leif G. W. Persson
- Backstrom (American TV series), an American television series based on books by Leif G. W. Persson
- Bäckström (Swedish TV series), Swedish 2020 television series based on books by Leif G. W. Persson
