= Murder of Per Häggström =

1996 murder in Stockholm, Sweden

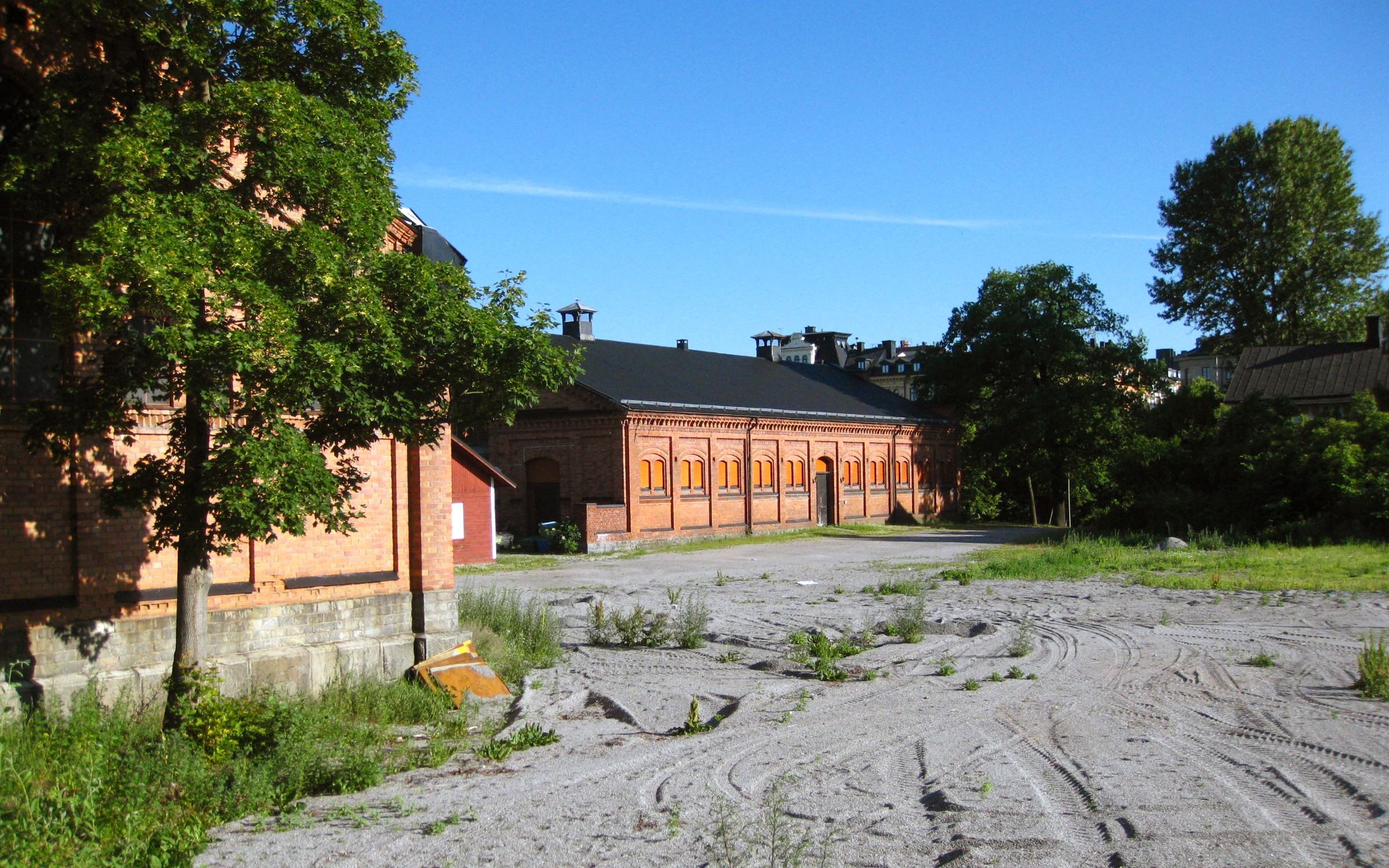
- The crime scene at Swartling Riding School, photographed in June 2011.
- Location of the crime.
- Location: 59°20′40″N 18°04′52″E; Valhallavägen 99, Stockholm, Sweden
- Date: 14 October 1996; 30 years ago c. 04:58–05:04 a.m. (Note: SOS Alarm received the emergency call at 5:04:20 a.m. from a public telephone booth at Karlavägen 52, approximately 600 metres from the crime scene. According to criminologist Leif G. W. Persson, this indicated that the crime had taken place a few minutes before 5:00 a.m.) (CEST)
- Weapon: Mora knife
- Deaths: 1
- Victim: 1
- Perpetrator: Unknown
- Motive: Robbery

The Murder of Per Häggström was an unsolved homicide committed in Stockholm, Sweden, on 14 October 1996. Häggström, aged 25, was a second-year land surveying student at KTH Royal Institute of Technology. In the early hours of that Monday morning, he was found seriously wounded after being stabbed at Swartlings Riding School on Valhallavägen 99 in the Östermalm district. He was taken to Karolinska Hospital but died during surgery.

Earlier that night, Häggström had attended a student party at the KTH student union building. He left at approximately 04:30, intending to spend the night at a friend's home in Gärdet. His last known sighting was between 04:40 and 04:45 near Stockholm East railway station. The circumstances surrounding the attack remain unclear, although investigators considered robbery a possible motive after discovering that approximately SEK 2,000 was missing from his wallet.

A central element of the investigation was an emergency call made to SOS Alarm at 05:04 by an unidentified man who claimed to have witnessed a robbery and described seeing a man in a grey jacket stabbing the victim. Despite extensive efforts, the caller was never identified, and investigators were unable to establish whether he had witnessed the murder or was involved in it.

Over the following years, several investigative leads emerged, but the case remained unsolved. In November 2013, a 39-year-old man was arrested on suspicion of murder. He admitted to making the emergency call but later withdrew his statement. Despite extensive forensic examinations, investigators failed to establish a connection between him and the crime. The preliminary investigation against him was discontinued in March 2014.

== Background ==
Per Johan Häggström, the only child of Sören Häggström, was born on 3 September 1971. He came from Nordingrå, Kramfors Municipality, Västernorrland County. His family's ancestral farm was located in Häggvik, Kramfors Municipality. Häggström lived in Nordingrå until 1979, when he was seven years old, after which his family moved to the Stockholm area. In 1996, Häggström was in his second year studying land surveying at KTH Royal Institute of Technology in Stockholm.

On Sunday, 13 October 1996, Häggström had been hunting in northern Sweden. He arrived in Stockholm by bus at approximately 23:00 and went directly to a student party for first-year students at the student union building Nymble, located at Drottning Kristinas väg 15. At approximately 04:30 on the morning of 14 October, he left the party to travel towards Gärdet, where he intended to spend the night at a friend's home. Between 04:40 and 04:45, a witness saw him standing outside the 7-Eleven store near Stockholm East railway station and the Tekniska högskolan metro station. His last known sighting was reported by another witness, who saw him standing at a bus stop approximately 50 metres further away.

== Murder ==
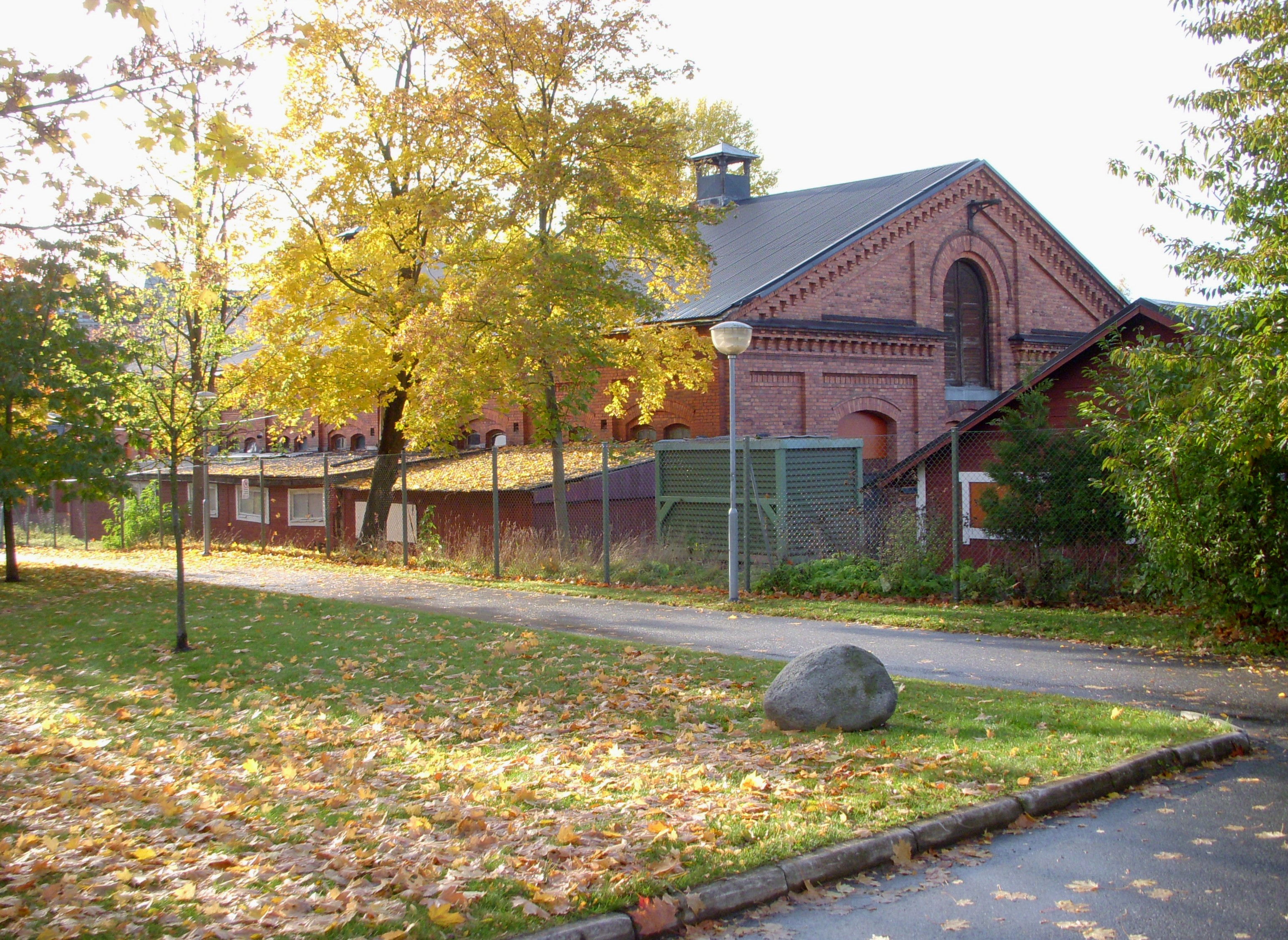
The footpath from which the person who raised the alarm allegedly witnessed the assault. Häggström was found inside the fence, to the right of the sand silo and the red wooden house.

On 14 October 1996, 25-year-old Per Häggström was found seriously wounded by knife at Swartlings Riding School, located at Valhallavägen 99 in Stockholm. Earlier that morning, Häggström had left a student party at KTH Royal Institute of Technology at approximately 04:30. He was heading towards Gärdet, where he intended to spend the night at a friend's home. A woman who attended the party later stated that she had danced with him less than an hour before his murder.

Between 04:40 and 04:45, a witness saw Häggström standing outside the 7-Eleven store near Stockholm East railway station and the Tekniska högskolan metro station. His last known sighting was reported by another witness, who saw him standing at a bus stop approximately 50 metres further away. Häggström was believed to have continued along Valhallavägen towards Gärdet, where he encountered his attacker near Swartlings Riding School. The exact circumstances leading to the attack remain unclear.

The riding school grounds were enclosed and relatively secluded from public view. Häggström was found lying between two buildings, approximately 50 metres from Valhallavägen and close to a fence. One theory was that he might have attempted to climb over the fence to escape his attacker. Criminologist Leif G. W. Persson later suggested that the perpetrator might have chased Häggström onto the grounds before catching up with him. According to Persson, the attack involved several knife wounds and may have lasted for some time.

An unidentified man contacted SOS Alarm at 05:04 on Monday, 14 October 1996, from a public telephone booth at Karlavägen 52. He reported that he had discovered a man who had been stabbed at Swartlings Riding School on Valhallavägen, saying: "Yes, hello, there's a guy who's been stabbed at... Valhallavägen, I think it's called, Swartling Riding School." The caller stated that he had witnessed a robbery and seen a man wearing a grey jacket stab the victim. He also explained that he had run away from the scene but intended to return to check on the injured man.

The caller was apparently the person who had discovered Häggström lying on the ground between two buildings on the grounds of Swartlings Riding School, while walking along a footpath between the Royal College of Music and Valhallavägen. His identity was never established, and investigators were unable to determine whether he was an eyewitness to the murder or had been involved in the crime. Häggström was still alive when the police arrived and managed to utter a few words to the first responding police officer. He was taken by ambulance to Karolinska Hospital, where he later died during surgery.

== Investigation ==
=== Initial investigation ===
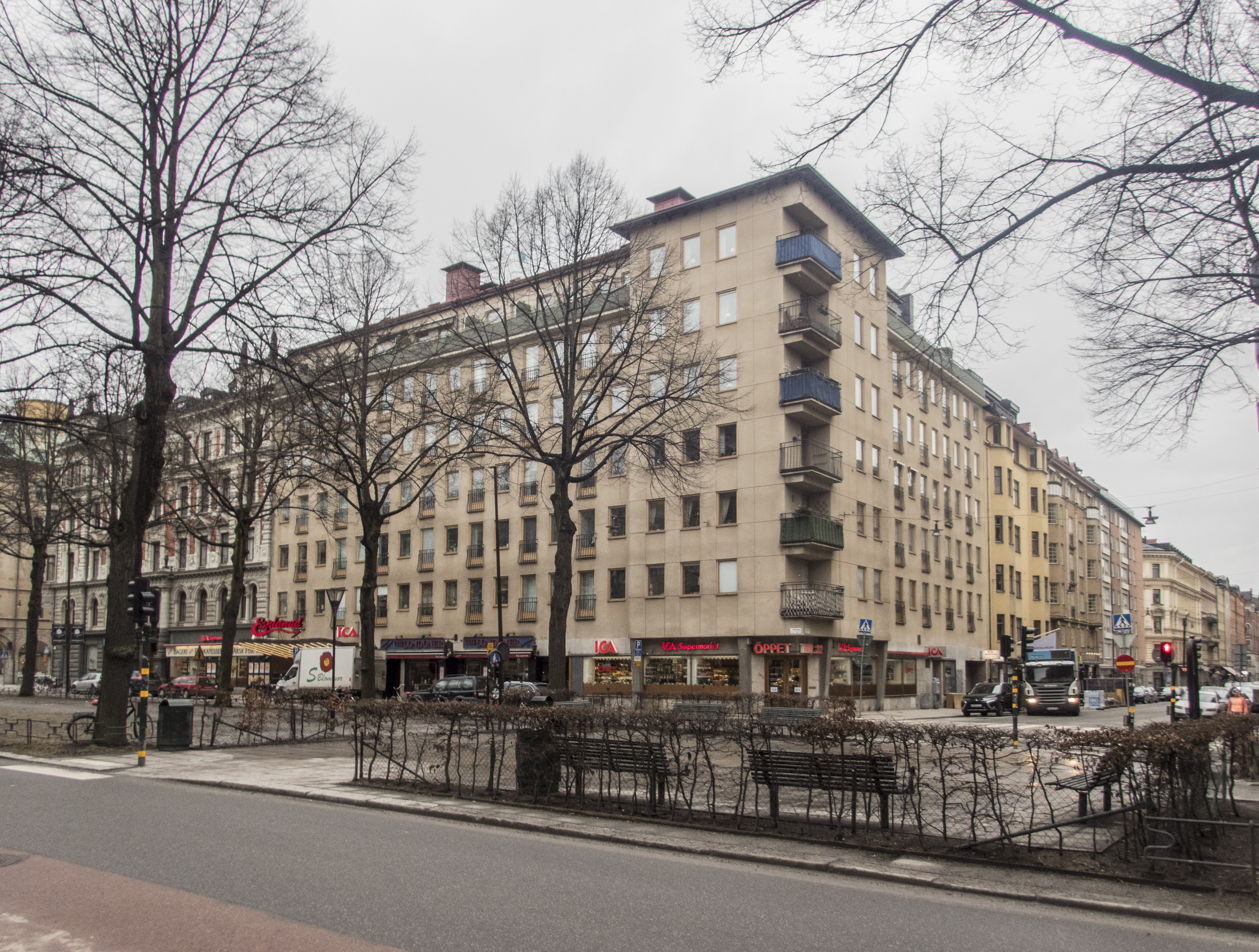
The emergency call was received by SOS Alarm from a public telephone booth at Karlavägen 52 (pictured), approximately 600 metres from the crime scene.

The unidentified caller told SOS Alarm that he had seen a person wearing a grey jacket attack Häggström with a knife. Despite extensive efforts, the caller was never identified or interviewed by the police. A couple travelling in a car also reported seeing a man wearing a grey jacket running away from the riding school shortly after the murder. Investigators were unable to establish whether this was the attacker or the person who had made the emergency call.

The murder weapon, a Mora knife, was found at the crime scene. Its sheath was discovered approximately 400 metres away, near the intersection of Valhallavägen and Villagatan. The distance between KTH and the 7-Eleven store where Häggström was last seen and the crime scene was approximately 800 metres. Police believed that the perpetrator might have spotted Häggström near Valhallagrillen (a fast-food kiosk) and followed him along Valhallavägen with the intention of robbing him. The sheath may have been dropped or discarded during the pursuit.

Häggström had defensive injuries and damage to his clothing. His wallet was found open beside him. Approximately SEK 2,000 was missing, although the remaining contents were still present. The police therefore considered robbery a possible motive. Häggström was described by Chief Inspector Bo Wide as approximately 192 cm tall and weighing around 95 kg. He was carrying a sports bag manufactured by Grays and wearing dark grey trousers and a short brown suede jacket.

Investigators appealed for witnesses who might have seen Häggström or anyone else in the area between 03:00 and 05:00 on the morning of the murder. They particularly wanted to establish whether he had walked along the pavement or through the avenue. The emergency call became one of the most important elements of the investigation. Approximately two weeks after the murder, the police released a recording of the call to the media in the hope that someone would recognise the caller. The unidentified man said that he had witnessed a robbery and described the victim as having received several knife wounds. He also stated that he needed to hurry back to check on the injured man.

Investigators established that the call had been made from a public telephone booth near the intersection of Karlavägen and Nybrogatan. Several witnesses had reported seeing a person running from Valhallavägen towards Brahegatan and then Karlavägen shortly after the murder. Police did not rule out the possibility that this person was either the attacker or the caller, or that both descriptions referred to the same individual. The police suspected that the murder had been committed during a robbery because the money was missing from Häggström's wallet. They did not disclose exactly how much money had been taken at the time, describing it only as an ordinary amount.

Criminologist Leif G. W. Persson later questioned the reliability of the caller's account. He pointed out that sunrise on the morning of the murder was at 07:24, meaning that the area would have been extremely dark at 05:04. He therefore questioned whether the caller could realistically have seen the attack as clearly as he claimed.

On 18 December 1996, Häggström's parents announced a reward of SEK 75,000 for information that could help identify the murderer. The investigation had made little progress, and the emergency call remained the most promising lead. Despite the recording being broadcast in the media, the caller had still not come forward. On 19 December 1996, it was reported that the police had received several new tips following the announcement of the reward.

Linguist Gunilla Thunberg analysed the caller's speech. She told ABC News that the caller's uncertain pronunciation of Valhallavägen suggested that he might not have been a resident of central Stockholm. Investigators, however, also considered the possibility that the caller had deliberately attempted to disguise his regional background, since he pronounced the street name differently later in the same recording.

=== Later investigative developments ===
On 22 July 1998, Matija Sovdat, who was being investigated in connection with several murders, underwent a forensic psychiatric examination. The police announced that they were examining possible connections between him and a number of unsolved or investigated cases, including the murder of Per Häggström.

In October 2001, it was reported that a man had become reasonably suspected of the murder and that a DNA sample had been taken from him for comparison with evidence collected at the crime scene. The television programme Efterlyst subsequently reported that the suspect was already being held in custody for another offence and had also been formally notified of suspicion in connection with Häggström's murder. However, investigators were unable to establish a sufficient connection between the man and the crime, and the investigation once again reached an impasse.

In 2004, the Stockholm County Criminal Investigation Department (Länskriminalen i Stockholm) established a special group to analyse and investigate old unsolved murder cases. The murder of Per Häggström was among the cases assigned to the group. By then, one person had been under suspicion for several years, but the police had not found the final pieces of evidence needed either to prosecute or conclusively exclude him.

In a 2012 review of so-called cold cases, commissioned by the Swedish National Police Board, Leif G. W. Persson examined the country's unsolved homicide investigations. The report found that there had been approximately 430 unsolved cases involving fatal violence as of 31 December 2010, and recommended that around 100 of them receive further investigation. The report also highlighted cases in which forensic evidence was available. On 1 July 2010, the statute of limitations for murder was abolished in Sweden. Murders committed on or after 1 July 1985 that had not already become time-barred could therefore continue to be investigated indefinitely.

In January 2013, Persson stated that the police had identified a suspected perpetrator of Häggström's murder. He described the individual as approximately 25 years old at the time of the crime, with a history of petty criminal activity and substance abuse, who lived in the area around Karlaplan. According to Persson, the main challenge was now obtaining sufficient evidence, particularly because so much time had passed. He believed that the lack of any previous relationship between Häggström and the suspected perpetrator had made the investigation more difficult. Persson also criticised shortcomings in the original investigation but expressed confidence in the renewed efforts, predicting that the case could be solved.

In April 2013, the Stockholm County Criminal Investigation Department's cold case unit took over the investigation. The original case material was reviewed, and investigators identified several matters that required further examination. According to prosecutor Erik Wendeby, this work led to a breakthrough during the preceding week. Persson had repeatedly stated that the cold case investigators had long been confident about the identity of the murderer. However, the police had been reluctant to confront the suspected individual before obtaining sufficiently reliable forensic evidence.

=== 2013 arrest ===
*SOS: SOS Alarm.

- Unknown caller: Yes, hello, there's a guy who's been stabbed at ... Valhallavägen, I think it's called, Swartling Riding School.
- SOS: What's your phone number?
- Unknown caller: I honestly fucking don't know.
- SOS: What do you mean? Where are you calling from, then?
- Unknown caller: Uh, Karlavägen, I think.
- SOS: Yeah.
- Unknown caller: I'm drunk as hell. I was walking past and saw a robbery. There was a guy wearing a grey jacket.
- SOS: Yeah.
- Unknown caller: I mean ...
- SOS: Where exactly are you calling from now?
- Unknown caller: Somewhere around Karlaplan, Karlavägen ... I honestly don't fucking know.
- SOS: Is it a phone booth, or ...?
- Unknown caller: Yes, it is.
- SOS: I see.
- Unknown caller: But listen, I have to run back and see how he's doing. I mean, he was stabbed several times.
- SOS: Yeah, where exactly did you say this happened?
- Unknown caller: Uh, Swartling Riding School on ... what the hell is it called, it must be ... Valhallavägen. I'm not from around here.
- SOS: Valhallavägen. Swartling Riding School?
- Unknown caller: Yeah, damn right! It's near Stadion, roughly.
- Unknown caller: I have to hurry back and check on the guy, I mean. This is bad, he was stabbed many times ... I just ran off.
- SOS: Yeah, I'll send the police there.
- Unknown caller: Bye.

— Transcription of the emergency call to SOS Alarm

On 21 November 2013, a 39-year-old man was summoned for questioning in connection with the 17-year-old murder investigation. During the interview, he was asked to provide a voice sample so that it could be compared with the recording of the emergency call made on the night of the murder. The man initially returned to his workplace after the interview. However, a few hours later, he contacted the investigating officer again and stated that he was the person who had made the call to SOS Alarm on 14 October 1996. The man, born in 1974, was subsequently arrested at 13:09 on probable cause on suspicion of murder. He was 22 years old at the time of the crime.

Two interviews were conducted before the detention hearing. During one of them, the man acknowledged making the emergency call, but later withdrew this statement during a second interview. He was remanded in custody on 24 November 2013. Shortly afterwards, he suffered a psychological breakdown and was transferred to a forensic psychiatric unit at Huddinge Hospital. He was placed under close observation because of concerns that he might harm himself. It was also decided that he would undergo a brief psychiatric evaluation.

According to reports in Aftonbladet, the man was extremely confused during questioning and at one point believed that the investigators were his parents. He also provided several different accounts of how the murder had taken place, some of which were inconsistent with established facts. He was reportedly unable to describe what he had seen at the crime scene. Prosecutor Erik Wendeby stated that further interviews were planned, provided that the man's condition allowed him to be questioned. The suspect continued to deny involvement in the murder.

At the time of the murder, the man was a student. Two years after the murder, the 39-year-old graduated. At the time of his arrest, he was employed as a consultant. He had no known previous criminal convictions. He was married and had young children. Investigators were also examining whether the suspect had lived near the crime scene at the time of the murder. Although he was officially registered at his parents' home outside Stockholm, he had registered an address not far from Valhallavägen 99 a couple of years after the crime. Police were investigating whether he had already been living in the area or had other connections to the riding school when Häggström was murdered.

One of the circumstances that reportedly contributed to the suspicion against the man was testimony that he had been wearing a bloodstained shirt after the KTH party on the night of the murder. According to reports in Expressen, witnesses had told the police about the shirt, although no such garment was ever recovered. Investigators collected DNA samples from the suspect for comparison with traces found on the murder weapon and on Häggström's body. They also obtained a voice sample for comparison with the SOS Alarm recording. Other evidence included photographs taken in the area around Valhallavägen after the murder and two computers seized from the suspect.

Leif G. W. Persson had previously maintained that the unidentified SOS caller was probably the murderer. Following the arrest, he reiterated his belief that the suspect was the person who had made the call. He stated that he was convinced the police had arrested the right person, but emphasised that the suspicion still had to be proven.

The suspect's arrest also attracted considerable media attention because of his apparently ordinary family life. In interviews with Expressen on 23 November 2013, his 27-year-old wife said that they had met in Stockholm in 2007 and had lived together since approximately 2008. They later had children and moved into a newly purchased house in a Stockholm suburb. She said that she was shocked by the allegations and had never known of any involvement in criminal activity. She also expressed concern about the impact of the investigation on their family.

=== Later developments ===
On 16 January 2014, after almost two months in custody, the suspect was allowed to meet his wife at Kronoberg Detention Centre. He had previously been held at the forensic psychiatric unit in Huddinge following his psychological breakdown. A further interview was conducted on 17 January 2014. Prosecutor Erik Wendeby indicated that he would probably request an extension of the investigation period, as several investigative measures remained outstanding. At that point, the suspect had been held in custody since November 2013. Wendeby stated that, in his assessment, there were still probable grounds for suspicion, an assessment that had also been accepted by the district court and the court of appeal.

On 6 February 2014, prosecutor Erik Wendeby decided to release the 40-year-old suspect from Kronoberg Detention Centre. He explained that the forensic investigation had not produced any evidence directly linking the man to the murder and that it was no longer proportionate to keep him in custody. The DNA analysis had produced no match, and investigators were still awaiting the results of the voice comparison. Wendeby confirmed that there had been no positive results from the forensic examinations completed at that stage. He stated that a final decision on whether the man would remain a suspect or be cleared would be made once the remaining investigative measures had been completed.

The voice analysis subsequently failed to establish a reliable connection between the suspect and the emergency call. His lawyer, Clea Sangborn, stated that the analysis had found no distinctive similarities between her client's voice and that of the caller. According to her, other speakers with the same regional and ethnic background and dialect could not be excluded. Wendeby confirmed that the voice analysis had not produced sufficiently reliable results to draw any firm conclusions.

On 6 February 2014, the prosecutor lifted the remaining restrictions on the suspect, including his travel ban and reporting obligation. His passport was also returned. The murder suspicion nevertheless remained in place temporarily while the investigation continued. Wendeby stated that the suspect could remain at liberty while the remaining investigative work was completed. On 14 March 2014, the prosecutor decided to discontinue the preliminary investigation against the man. He was therefore no longer under investigation as a suspect in the murder.

In August 2014, the issue of preserving forensic evidence from old crime scenes received renewed attention. A proposal was being considered to establish a specialised unit within the National Laboratory of Forensic Science (SKL) to store and analyse evidence from cold cases. The proposal followed concerns raised in a report written by Leif G. W. Persson and criminologist Mikael Rying for the Swedish National Police Board in August 2012. The report had highlighted that evidence from old crime scenes had sometimes been discarded or destroyed, making it impossible to use modern DNA techniques in later investigations. At the time of the 2014 reports, Sweden had approximately 500 unsolved murder cases. The cold case unit in Stockholm had six investigators responsible for a list of 145 unsolved murders, including the murder of Per Häggström.

== Aftermath ==
Häggström is buried at Nordingrå Cemetery (pictured)

Häggström was registered as living in Ekerö, Stockholm County, at the time of his murder. His funeral service was held at Skå Church on Färingsö, Ekerö Municipality, on 25 October 1996. He was buried on 31 October 1996 in the memorial garden at Nordingrå Cemetery in his hometown of Nordingrå.

In December 1996, his parents announced a reward of SEK 75,000 for information leading to the identification and arrest of their son's murderer. The reward was offered in the hope that someone would come forward with information that could help solve the case.

== In the media ==
On 17 October 1996, the case was first featured on TV3's crime investigation television program Efterlyst. The program has revisited the case numerous times over the years.

On 7 November 2005, the case was revisited in episode 7 in the TV4's show Cold Case Sverige.

On 1 March 2011, the case was revisited in episode 6 och season 2 in the Sveriges Television's program Veckans brott.

On 15 October 2020, the case was revisited in an episode of the podcast Olösta fall.

On 30 November 2022, the case was revisited in an episode of the podcast Spotify Dok.

On 13 January 2023, the case was revisited in an episode of the podcast Svenska Mordhistorier.

== Popular culture ==
The murder of Per Häggström has also attracted attention in popular culture through journalist Jonas Malmborg's debut novel, Fältöversten, published by Albert Bonniers Förlag. The book's title refers to the Fältöversten residential complex near Karlaplan in Östermalm, where the youth gang portrayed in the novel was based. The novel, which is partly inspired by Malmborg's own experiences growing up in the area, is a work of fiction that weaves the 1996 murder at Swartling's Riding School together with a portrayal of the youth gang. In the book, members of the gang are linked to the circumstances surrounding the murder.

== See also ==
- Murder of Anders Gustafsson
