= Agenda (Swedish TV program) =

- Genre: Current affairs
- Created by: Swedish television
- Presented by: see below
- Country of origin: Sweden
- Original language: Swedish

Production
- Production location: Stockholm
- Running time: 45 minutes

Original release
- Network: Swedish television
- Release: 2001 – present

Agenda is a Swedish current events television program broadcast on Sveriges Television. The program debuted in 2001, hosted by Lars Adaktusson. A commentary, a summary of the news week, and a look at upcoming events were initially recurring segments but were later removed. The program has changed timeslots several times but is currently airing Sundays at 21.15 on SVT 2.

== Hosts ==
- 2001–2005 – Lars Adaktusson
- 2001–2008 – Karin Hübinette
- 2008–2010 – Karin Hübinette and Anna Hedenmo
- 2010–2011 – Anna Hedenmo and Marianne Rundström
- 2011 – Anna Hedenmo and Camilla Kvartoft
- 2012–present – Mats Knutson

== Awards ==
The program has been nominated for the television award Kristallen three times:

- 2006 – Årets nyhetsprogram ("News show of the year")
- 2009 – Årets nyhets- och debattprogram ("News- and debate program of the year")
- 2010 – Årets fakta- och aktualitetsprogram ("Fact- and current events program of the year")
