= Dick Van Dyke (disambiguation) =

Dick Van Dyke (born 1925) is an American actor, entertainer and comedian.

Dick Van Dyke may also refer to:

- Dick van Dyke (politician) (1931–1986), American politician

== See also ==
- Dick van Dijk (1946–1997), Dutch footballer
- Dick van Dijk (darts player) (born 1970), Dutch darts player
