= Karin Hübinette =

Swedish journalist and television presenter

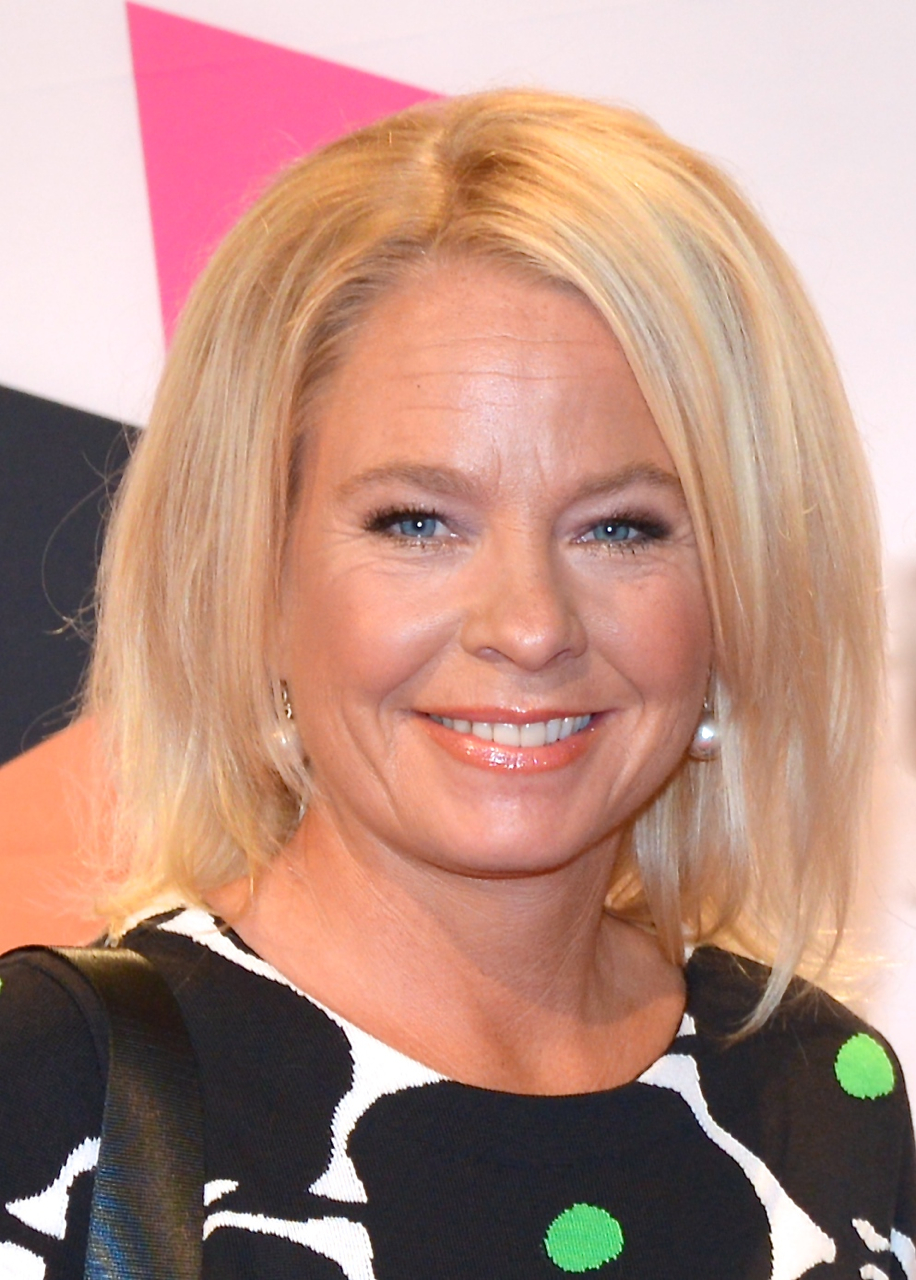
- Hübinette in 2013
- Born: Ragnhild Maria Hübinette; 18 April 1966 (age 59); Sollentuna, Sweden
- Occupations: Television presenter, journalist
- Spouse: Karl Inge Johnny Hübinette
- Parents: Georg Pettersson (father); Barbro Pettersson (mother)
- Relatives: Hillevi Engström (sister)

Karin Ragnhild Maria Hübinette (née Pettersson; born 18 April 1966) is a Swedish journalist and television presenter.

She was born in Sollentuna. She is the sister of politician Hillevi Engström. Hübinette started her career as the presenter of the debate show Svart eller vitt, which was broadcast on TV4 in the mid-1990s.

After that she presented Uppdrag granskning and Kvällsöppet, and was also a reporter at Sveriges Radio. She then worked solely for SVT presenting the news shows Agenda and Aktuellt. She is a board member of the company Hands on AB.

When her sister Hillevi Engström, who is a politician for the Moderate Party, became secretary of employment after the general elections in 2010, Hübinette had to resign from her work as a journalist at Agenda and Aktuellt. She however remained working at SVT, where she became a foreign reporter for the show Korrespondenterna. One year later she started presenting her own talk show, called Hübinette, which aired for two seasons in 2011 and 2012.

Karin Hübinette returned to presenting Agenda in 2014, after the program changed format and added Camilla Kvartoft and others as presenters. This means that if her sister appears on the show, one of the other presenters can interview her.
