= Leif G. W. Persson =

Swedish criminologist and novelist (born 1945)

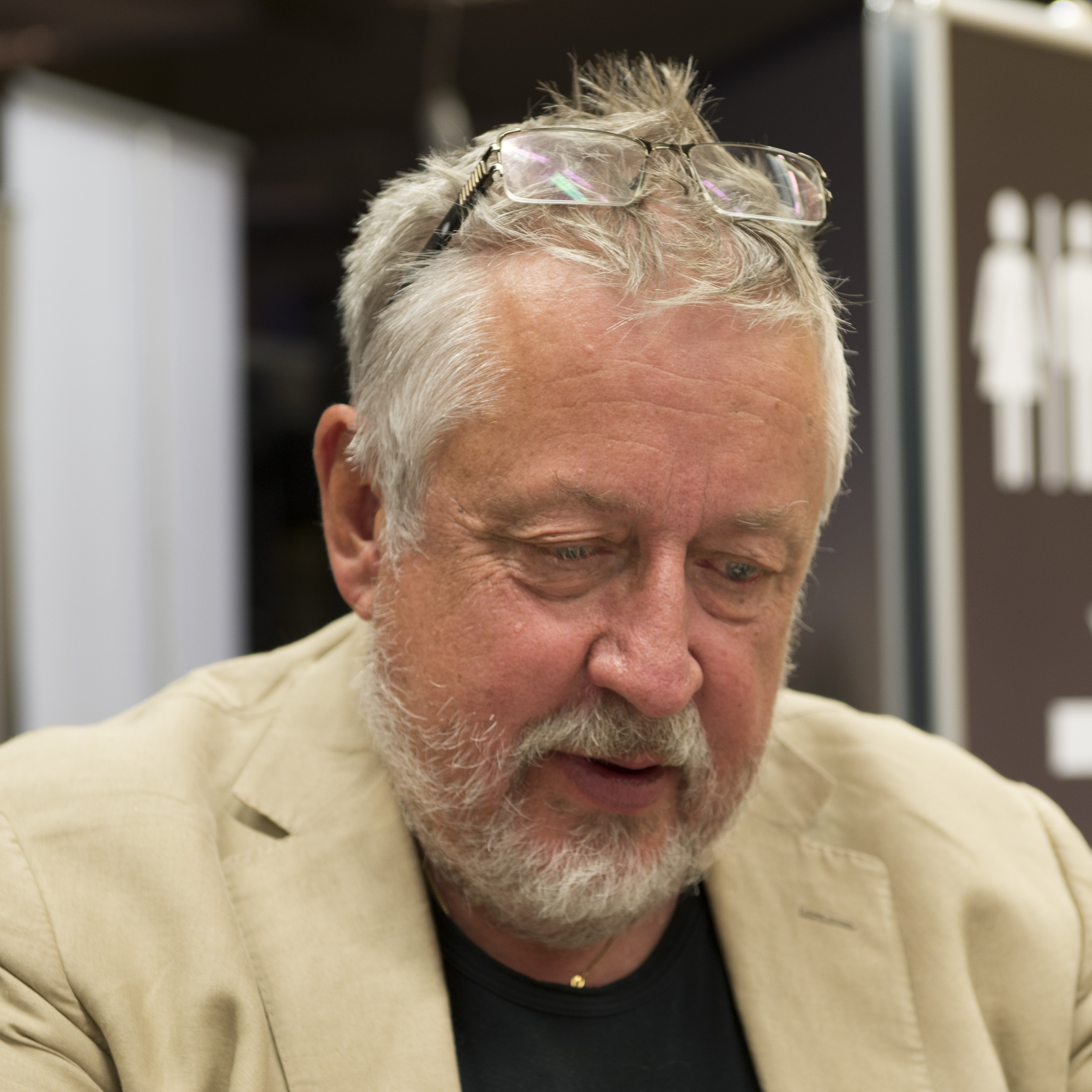
- Leif G.W. Persson at the Gothenburg Book Fair in 2013
- Born: Leif Gustav Willy Persson; 12 March 1945 (age 81); Stockholm, Sweden
- Occupations: Novelist; criminologist
- Writing career
- Period: 1978–present
- Genres: Crime fiction; mystery fiction
- Notable works: He Who Kills the Dragon; Falling Freely, As in a Dream; Linda - as in the Linda Murder Case
- Website: www.leifgwpersson.se

Leif Gustav Willy Persson (born 12 March 1945) is a Swedish criminologist and novelist. Persson has four children, one of whom, Malin Persson Giolito, is also a crime writer.

== Early life ==
Leif Gustav Willy Persson was born on 12 March 1945 in Stockholm, Sweden to Gustav and Margit Persson. He attended the High School Norra Real.

== Career ==
In 1977, while working at the Swedish National Police Board, Persson was the whistleblower who worked with journalist Peter Bratt in the so-called Geijer Scandal when he confirmed a classified memo sent by then National Police Commissioner Carl Persson to Prime Minister Olof Palme about the alleged ties of the Minister of Justice, Lennart Geijer, to a prostitution ring in Stockholm. Following this affair he was fired from the National Police Board. The string of events almost drove Persson to suicide, but he soon returned as lecturer at Stockholm University. The prostitution ring affair inspired him to write his first novel, Grisfesten. He returned to the National Police Board as a professor in 1992.

Persson was a professor in criminology at the Swedish National Police Board from 1992 to 2012. He is well known in Sweden for his crime fiction novels and for his regular appearances as an expert commentator on notable crime cases on television and in newspapers. Between 1999 and 2009, he participated as an expert commentator on the TV3 television show Efterlyst, which is primarily about wanted Swedish criminals. Between 2010 and 2018, he participated in the SVT television show Veckans Brott with Camilla Kvartoft, which is primarily about unsolved Swedish criminal cases both recent and cold. In 2018, his move to SVT's competitor TV4 was widely published. At TV4, his new show Brottsjournalen (2018 - 2020) covered primarily recent and cold Swedish criminal cases that went unsolved together with Jenny Strömstedt.

== Media stardom and personality ==
In 1990, Persson together with Jan Guillou and Pär Lorentzon appeared in an SVT program Grabbarna på Fagerhult, indulging in hunting, fishing, and other traditionally male leisure activities.

Often referred to simply as "GW", he frequently appears on television, radio, and in other media as a commentator on crime and criminology. Among other things, he is an expert on the unsolved 1986 assassination of Swedish prime minister Olof Palme and has been harshly critical of police and prosecutors. His extraordinary media stardom has in recent years been the theme of several journalistic investigations; at one point, Swedish public radio asked "How much Leif GW Persson can Sweden handle?".

A self-described bacchanalian and an alcoholic, Persson has famously coped with his addiction by practicing a strict half-year regime since the late 1980s: denying himself alcohol (and other drugs) for six months and then drinking heavily during the rest of the year. In 2018, at age 73, he announced that his failing health would prevent him from fully resuming alcohol use, lamenting that he would henceforth be "unrecognizable" for an entire year instead of the usual six sober months.

Persson, who is overweight and has at times been very obese, has also struggled with his food intake. In the early 2000s, he was forced to abandon a habit of "food orgies" – regular bouts of extremely lavish, high-end gourmet dining and drinking – with his friend, the media mogul Jan Stenbeck, after his physician warned that his heart could not take another year of it. According to Persson, it was Stenbeck's refusal to cut back on the gourmandizing that led to his death in 2002.

== Bibliography ==
- Grisfesten (1978; The Pig Party)
- Profitörerna (1979; The Profiteers)
- Hidden criminality: theoretical and methodological problems, empirical results (1980)
- Min kompetens (1981; My Competence)
- Samhällsbärarna (1982; The Pillars of Society)
- Mellan sommarens längtan och vinterns köld (2002 – first volume in a trilogy that deals with Sweden in the Cold War era and events related to the yet unsolved 1986 murder of Swedish prime minister Olof Palme; Between Summer's Longing and Winter's End, UK 2010, trans. Paul Norlen).
- En annan tid, ett annat liv (2003 – second volume in the trilogy; Another Time, Another Life, UK 2012, trans. Paul Norlen)
- Linda - som i Lindamordet (2005 – Evert Bäckström book 1; Linda – as in the Linda Murder, UK 2013, trans. Neil Smith)
- Faller fritt som i en dröm (2007 – third volume in the trilogy; Falling Freely, as if in a Dream, UK 2014, trans. Paul Norlen)
- Den som dödar draken (2008 – Evert Bäckström book 2; He Who Kills the Dragon, UK 2013, trans. Neil Smith)
- Den döende detektiven (2010; The Dying Detective)
- Gustavs Grabb (2011 – autobiography)
- Den sanna historien om Pinocchios näsa (2013 – Evert Bäckström book 3; The Sword of Justice)
- Bombmakaren och hans kvinna (2015)

=== Evert Bäckström novels ===
Three of Persson's novels feature homicide detective Evert Bäckström. He appeared as a supporting character in the TV mini-series En pilgrims död and Den fjärde mannen. In both of these series, Bäckström was played by Claes Malmberg.

An American TV Series was made in 2015 entitled Backstrom. The show takes place in Portland, Oregon, and Backstrom was played by Rainn Wilson. The show was cancelled after one season.

In a Swedish TV series Bäckström (2020), the title role is played by Kjell Bergqvist. The first season of six episodes aired in 2020. The second season of six episodes aired in 2022. A third season, also of six episodes, broadcast in 2024.

=== Jarnebring and Johansson ===
Several of Persson's novels feature police officers Bo Jarnebring and Lars Martin Johansson, partners and best friends.

In the film Mannen från Mallorca (adapted from the novel Grisfesten) Jarnebring is played by Sven Wollter, and Johansson by Tomas von Brömssen. Two TV mini-series featuring the characters were produced starring Rolf Lassgård as Johansson and Per Svensson as Jarnebring: En pilgrims död (2013) and Den fjärde mannen (2014–15). (These two series also featured Persson's other character Evert Bäckström.) A third series Den döende detektiven was broadcast in 2018.

=== Anna Holt ===
Created by Persson, police detective Anna Holt has appeared in both Persson's novels, and in novels by fellow author Jan Guillou. Holt has also appeared in several television adaptations starring Petra Nielsen.

== Notable adaptations ==
- Profitörerna (TV series, 1983)
- Mannen från Mallorca (The Man from Majorca, film, 1984)
- I lagens namn (In the Name of the Law, film, 1986)
- En pilgrims död (Death of a Pilgrim, TV mini-series, 2013)
- Den fjärde mannen (The Fourth Man, TV mini-series, 2014–15)
- Den döende detektiven (The Dying Detective, TV mini-series, 2018)
- Backstrom, (US TV series, 2015)
- Bäckström, (TV series, 2020–present)

== Awards ==
Persson won the Best Swedish Crime Novel Award (Bästa svenska kriminalroman), for three of his novels: Samhällsbärarna in 1982, En annan tid, ett annat liv in 2003, and Den döende detektiven in 2010. This award is a literary prize awarded annually by the Swedish Crime Writers' Academy.

He also received the 2011 Glass Key award for Den döende detektiven (The Dying Detective); this award is a given annually to a crime novel by an author from the Nordic countries and the 2011 Palle Rosenkrantz Prize, which is awarded by the Det danske Kriminalakademi for the best criminal literature translated into Danish.
