= The Man from Majorca =

- Theatrical poster
- Swedish: Mannen från Mallorca
- Directed by: Bo Widerberg
- Written by: Bo Widerberg
- Screenplay by: Bo Widerberg
- Based on: Pig Party by Leif G.W. Persson
- Produced by: Göran Lindström
- Starring: Sven Wollter; Tomas von Brömssen
- Edited by: Bo Widerberg
- Music by: Björn J:son Lindh
- Production companies: Drakfilm Produktion, Swedish Film Institute, SF Studios, Sveriges Television, Filmhuset, Crone Film Sales ApS
- Distributed by: SF Studios, Europafilm, Swedish Film Institute
- Release date: 12 October 1984 (Sweden)
- Running time: 102 minutes
- Country: Sweden
- Language: Swedish
- Budget: 500 000 SEK
- Box office: 15 million SEK

The Man from Majorca (Swedish: Mannen från Mallorca) is a 1984 Swedish crime thriller film directed by Bo Widerberg. It is based on the novel The Pig Party by Leif G. W. Persson. The film stars Sven Wollter and Tomas von Brömssen.

The novel has big similarities with the Geijer affair (a rumor that the Swedish minister of justice had been with prostitutes, that the Swedish police had knowledge of it and had informed the prime minister). Leif G.W. Persson lost his job at the police because talking to a journalist about his knowledge about the Geijer case, but denied in the preface of the book (Grisfesten) which he wrote soon after, that it had any connections to the affair.

Widerberg took inspiration from the 1971 American film The French Connection, and The Man from Majorca share similarities with his previous thriller film: The Man on the Roof (1976).

Sven Wollter won the award for Best Actor at the 20th Guldbagge Awards.

== Plot ==
A robber calmly holds up a post-office in Stockholm at Saint Lucy's Day 13 December. The policemen Johansson and Jarnebring are the first on the scene and they chase the robber, who escapes. Shortly after, someone dies in a car accident and a dead body is found at a graveyard. After a while it is clear that these incidents have something to do with the robbery, and when the policemen are investigating further, they are beginning to reveal a bigger scandal. Meanwhile, it seems that there is a cover-up going on.

== Cast ==
- Sven Wollter as Bo Jarnebring: Inspector on the investigation department
- Tomas von Brömssen as Lars Martin "Johan" Johansson: Jarnebring's colleague
- Håkan Serner as Andersson: Inspector
- Ernst Günther as M. Dahlgren: Inspector and chief
- Thomas Hellberg as Berg: Bureau chief
- Ingvar Hirdwall as Fors
- Niels Jensen as Roger "Rogge" Jansson: High school student, previously small criminal
- Tommy Johnson as Rundberg: Inspector
- Rico Rönnbäck as Kjell Göran Hedberg: Working at the Swedish Security Service
- Hans Villius as The Minister for Justice
- Sten Lonnert as Erik Harald Olsson: Alcoholic
- Nina Gunke as Eva Zetterberg: Prostitute
- Margreth Weivers as Alva Wiström: Witness on Skogskyrkogården
- Gun Karlsson as Fru Forsberg: Witness to the post office robbery
- Marie Delleskog as Janna: Jansson's sister

== Notes ==
- Stardust Allt om Film Magazine #2 2007, article "Sveriges bästa snutar" pp. 72–73, It is media Svenska AB, Stockholm
