= Charles Moon =

American politician (1923–2001)

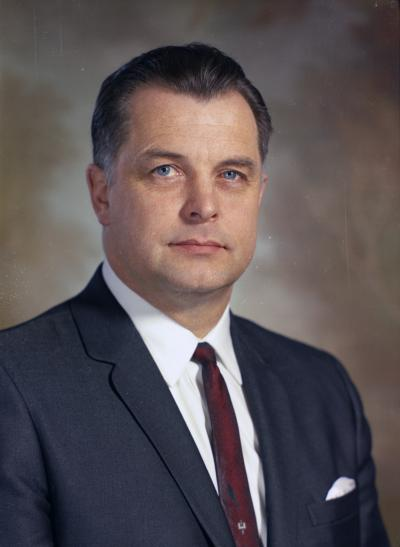
- Moon in 1967

Member of the Washington House of Representatives from the 39th district
- In office January 14, 1963 – January 10, 1977
- Preceded by: Henry Backstrom
- Succeeded by: Art Clemente
- In office January 10, 1983 – January 14, 1985
- Preceded by: Gary H. Scott
- Succeeded by: Dick van Dyke

Personal details
- Born: Charles Eric Moon; May 6, 1923 Sheridan, Wyoming, U.S.
- Died: April 9, 2001 (aged 77) Snohomish County, Washington, U.S.
- Party: Democratic

Charles Eric (Chuck) Moon (May 6, 1923 – April 9, 2001) was an American politician in the state of Washington. He served in the Washington House of Representatives from 1963 to 1977 and 1983 to 1985
