= Anna Hedenmo =

Swedish journalist and television presenter

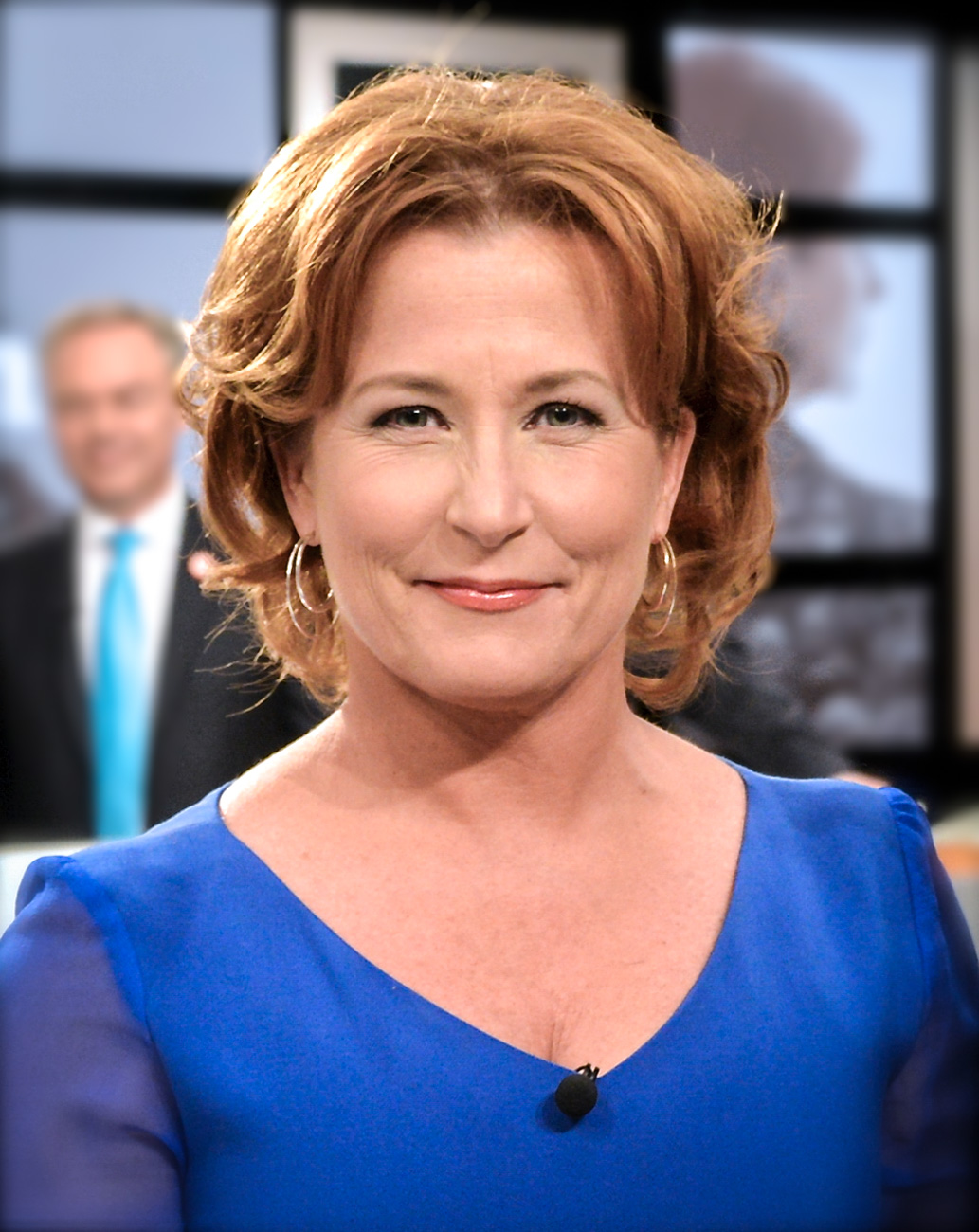
- Hedenmo in 2014
- Born: Anna Birgitta Hedenmo; 21 March 1961 (age 65); Stockholm, Sweden
- Occupations: Television presenter, journalist

Anna Birgitta Hedenmo (née Olsson; born 21 March 1961) is a Swedish journalist and television presenter who worked for SVT from 1993 to 2024. She is best known as the presenter of Agenda, and the interview show Min sanning (My truth) where she interviewed people who got to tell their truth. She has also been a news reader for Rapport and Aktuellt.

During the 2010 and 2014 General Election in Sweden she and Mats Knutson presented the traditional party leaders interrogations as well as the final debate with all the party leaders. Other shows that Hedenmo has presented include the kids quiz show Vi i femman (as judge in the knowledge section), SVT coverage in 2003 of the Euro-vote, Bumerang, Debatt, Millenniet jorden runt (show that covered the new Millennium and how every country celebrated it on New Year's Eve) and the morning show Gomorron Sverige (Good morning Sweden).

In June 2024, Anna Hedenmo left her work at SVT after more than thirty years. She started working for EFN Ekonomikanalen the same year. She was also replaced as presenter of ”Agenda” at SVT by Thomas Nordenskiöld.
