= Art Clemente =

American politician (1925–2021)

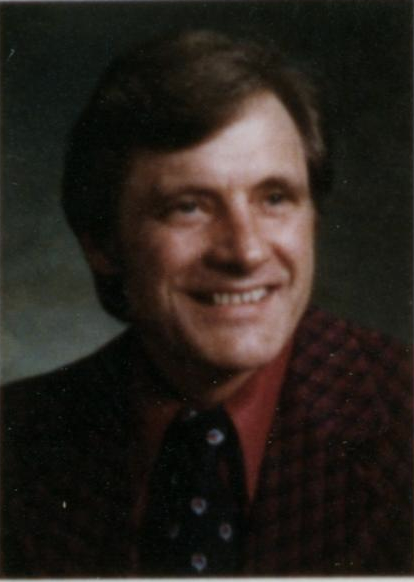
- Clemente in 1977

Member of the Washington House of Representatives from the 39th district
- In office January 8, 1973 – January 8, 1979
- Preceded by: Charles Moon
- Succeeded by: James B. Mitchell

Personal details
- Born: Arthur Leonard Clemente; July 7, 1925 Hoquiam, Washington, U.S.
- Died: November 22, 2021 (aged 96) Lynnwood, Washington, U.S.
- Party: Democratic

Arthur Leonard Clemente (July 7, 1925 – November 22, 2021) was an American politician in the state of Washington. He served the 39th district from 1973 to 1979.
