= Hillevi Engström =

Swedish politician (born 1963)

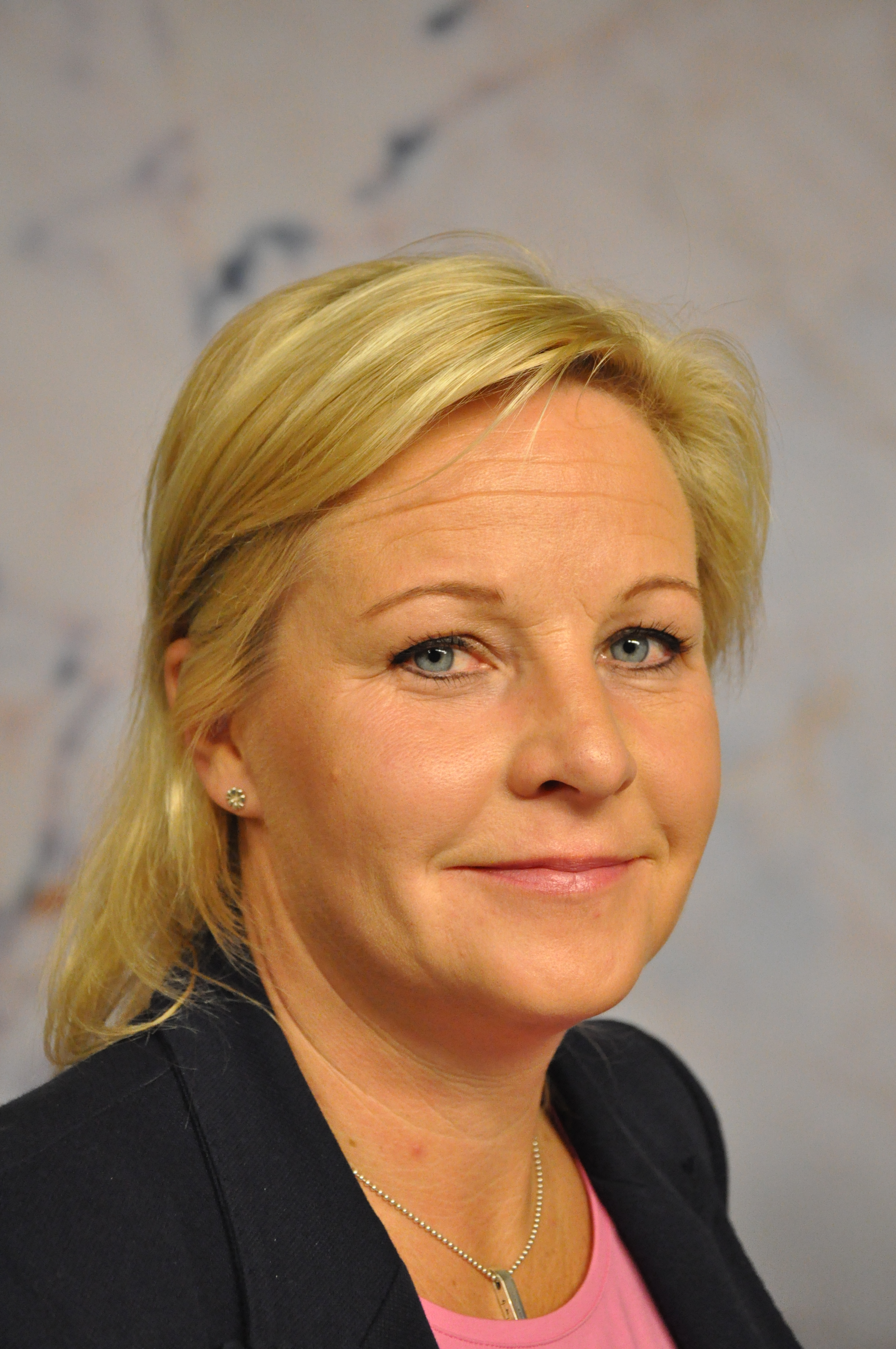

Minister for International Development Cooperation
- In office 17 September 2013 – 3 October 2014
- Prime Minister: Fredrik Reinfeldt
- Preceded by: Gunilla Carlsson
- Succeeded by: Isabella Lövin

Minister for Employment
- In office 5 October 2010 – 17 September 2013
- Prime Minister: Fredrik Reinfeldt
- Preceded by: Tobias Billström
- Succeeded by: Elisabeth Svantesson

Member of the Swedish Riksdag for Stockholm County
- In office 2002–2015
- Succeeded by: Erik Ottoson

Personal details
- Born: Hillevi Maria Pettersson; 15 April 1963 (age 63) Sollentuna, Stockholm
- Party: Moderate Party
- Spouse: Patrik Kronegård
- Parents: Georg Pettersson (father); Barbro Pettersson (mother)
- Relatives: Karin Hübinette (sister)
- Occupation: Politician

Hillevi Maria Engström (née Pettersson; born 15 April 1963 in Sollentuna) is a Swedish former politician who served as Minister for Employment from 2010 to 2013 and as Minister for International Development Cooperation from 2013 to 2014. A member of the Moderate Party, she served as a Member of the Swedish Riksdag from 2002 to 2015.

Prior to her political engagements she worked as a police inspector and was in 1995 the ombudsperson for the Swedish Police Association, the first woman to hold that position. She is the sister of the Swedish journalist and presenter Karin Hübinette.

Since 1 March 2015, Engström has served as chief director of Upplands Väsby Municipality.

Police appointments
| Preceded by Unknown | Walking Delegate to the Police Union; 1995 | Succeeded by Unknown |
Political offices
| Preceded by Tobias Billström | Minister for Employment; 2010-2013 | Succeeded by Elisabeth Svantesson |
| Preceded by Gunilla Carlsson | Minister for International Development Cooperation; 2013–2014 | Succeeded by Isabella Lövin |
