= Hasse Aro =

Swedish television host

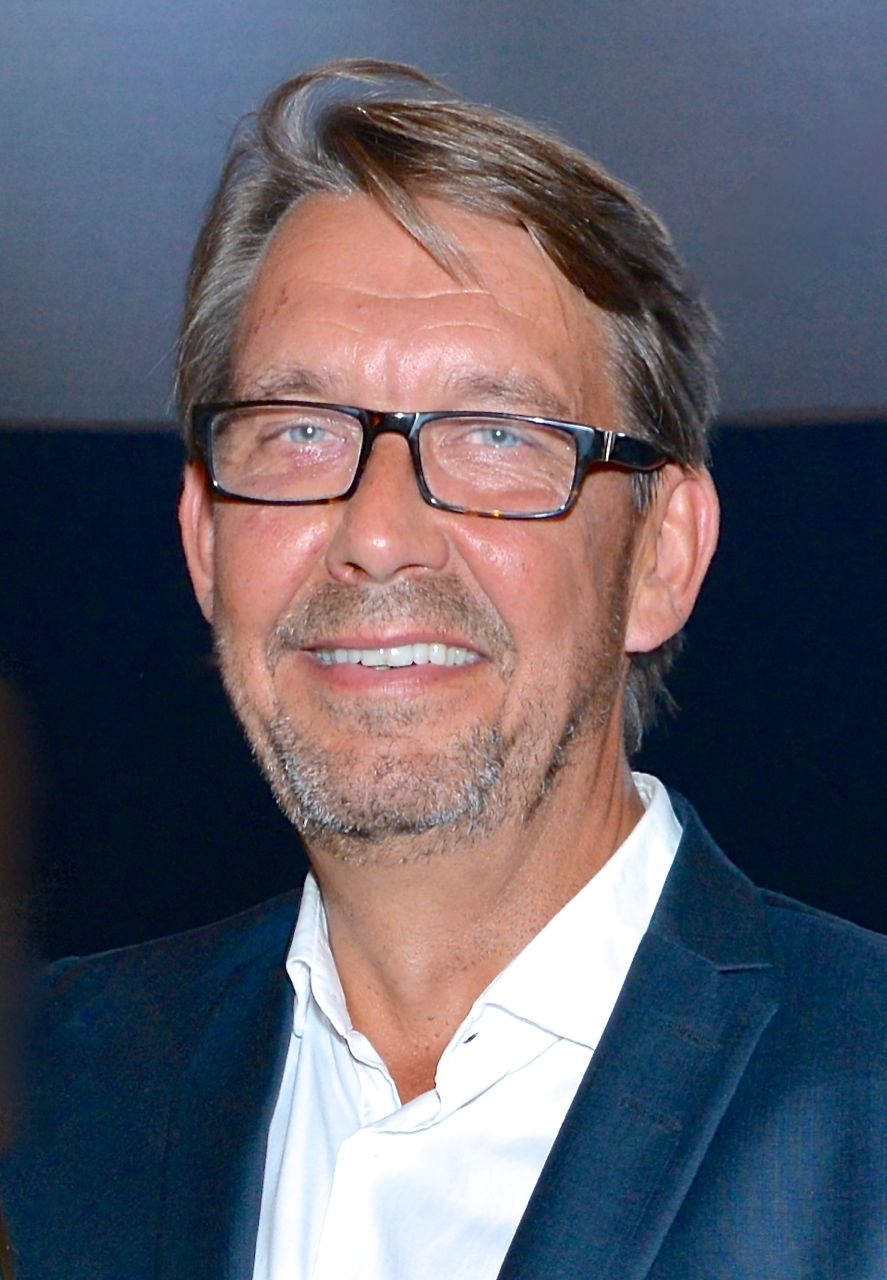
- Aro in 2013
- Born: 8 September 1957 (age 68); Södertälje, Sweden
- Occupations: Television host, Television producer
- Known for: Host of Efterlyst

Hans-Göran "Hasse" Aro (born 8 September 1957) is a Swedish television host and producer, best known for hosting TV3's true crime television program Efterlyst.

Aro was born in Södertälje, Sweden, to Finnish parents.

Aro is a longtime host of TV3's true crime television program Efterlyst, which he has hosted since 1991. First from 1991 to February 2014, and then again since its relaunch in 2018.

Aro has won Kristallen awards for best male television host of the year in 2005 and 2007, for best television production in 2005 and 2008, and for best fact program of the year in 2013.
