= Karlavägen =

Street in central Stockholm, Sweden

Coordinates: 59°20′41.7″N 18°3′49.2″E

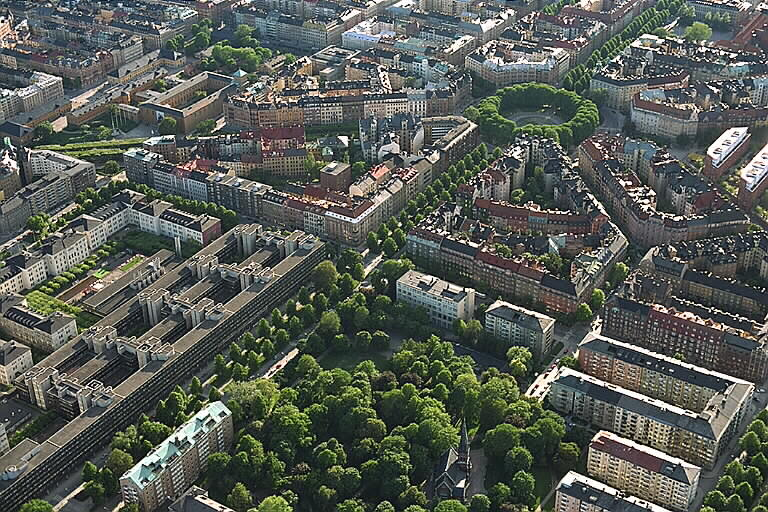
Karlavägen and Karlaplan, aerial view, 1994.

Karlavägen is a street in the burough of Östermalm in Stockholm. It extends from Birger Jarlsgatan to Oxenstiernsgatan. Engelbrektskyrkan, Humlegården and Tyska skolan are situated along it.

== See also ==
- Geography of Stockholm
