= Bäckström (Swedish TV series) =

Swedish TV crime drama series

- Genre: Crime drama
- Based on: Kan man dö två gånger?, Den sanna historien om Pinocchios näsa, and characters created by Leif G. W. Persson
- Screenplay by: Leif G. W. Persson; Jonathan Sjöberg; Dennis Magnusson
- Directed by: Jonathan Sjöberg; Amanda Adolfsson; Manuel Concha; Andreas Öhman; David Berron
- Starring: Kjell Bergqvist; Agnes Lindström Bolmgren; Pekka Strang; Filip Berg; Peshang Rad; Rolf Lydahl; Elvis Stegmar
- Original languages: Swedish, English, Finnish, Russian, Spanish
- No. of seasons: 3
- No. of episodes: 18

Production
- Running time: 43 minutes
- Production company: TV4

Original release
- Network: C More Entertainment
- Release: 23 March 2020

Bäckström is a Swedish television crime drama series, which was broadcast on C More Film from 23 March 2020. It is based on Leif G. W. Persson's book series about police inspector Evert Bäckström. For the Swedish show Evert is depicted by Kjell Bergqvist, across three seasons of six episodes each. Season one's action is largely set in Stockholm and its surroundings, filming began in Gothenburg in March 2019 with Jonathan Sjöberg and Amanda Adolfsson directing three episodes each. Sjöberg was also the main scriptwriter with Dennis Magnusson. Assisting in each season are Evert's colleagues Ankan (Agnes Lindström Bolmgren), Toivonen (Pekka Strang), Kristian (Filip Berg), Adam (Peshang Rad) and Peter (Rolf Lydahl). Evert mentors his upstairs neighbour Edvin (Elvis Stegmar).

During the first season, which is based on Persson's Kan man dö två gånger? (English: Can You Die Twice?), Evert's team investigate the death of Jaidee (Sandra Yi Sencindiver), who supposedly died in Thailand during the 2004 Asian tsunami. However, Edvin found Jaidee's skull, with a bullet hole, on a Swedish island. Evert has to contend with various suspects, including his celebrity TV rival, the lawyer Tomas (Jens Hultén), scout leader Haqvin (Johan Widerberg) and Jaidee's husband Daniel (Linus Wahlgren). Season two, based on Den sanna historien om Pinocchios näsa (2013, English: The True Story of Pinocchio's Nose) has Evert discovered at Tomas's murder scene. Besides solving that crime, Evert searches for a unique child's toy and musical box, shaped as Pinocchio, while obscuring its significance from his colleagues and evading his enemies. The third season is based on Persson's characters with its action mostly set in Palma de Mallorca (Palma), Spain. Besides solving a local murder, Evert hopes to resolve the historical murder of his first love, Sally. An American TV series, Backstrom (2015), is based on the same character, but transposed to Portland, Oregon.

== Premise ==
Season one:

In mid-2019 Edvin brings a human skull to Evert, which he found on Ofärds Island. Toivonen wants Evert to investigate an armoured car robbery but Evert refuses: he only does homicides. Ankan takes on the robbery case while also assisting Evert. When Evert brags on national TV to his rival, Tomas, that the robbery is simple, he annoys both Ankan and Toivonen. The latter appoints Hanna to supervise Evert. Toivonen also assigns injured policemen, Olsson and Olzzon, to assist Evert. With Peter's help Evert finds the rest of the skeleton inside an overgrown root cellar – it has been there for eight years. DNA analysis determines that the remains belong to Jaidee. However, Nadja has discovered that Jaidee died during the 2004 Asian tsunami, in Thailand. Jaidee's corpse was identified by her husband Daniel and her DNA checked by a Swedish police team led by Hanna's father.

Edvin suspects his scout leader Haqvin and finds photos: one shows Haqvin yachting with Jaidee, another links Daniel, Haqvin and Tomas. Evert starts a relationship with publicist Tina. After visiting Thailand, Evert believes that Jaidee and Daniel formed a threesome with bar girl Jada. When Jada died in the tsunami, Daniel and Jaidee used the opportunity for insurance fraud. Thereafter Jaidee posed as Jada. By mid-2011, Jaidee wanted to leave Daniel. Tomas advised Daniel to stop Jaidee as they would both face fraud convictions. Tina betrays Evert to her Russian mafia debt collectors, who want him to stop investigating their robbery. Although wounded, Evert survives the encounter. According to Evert, Daniel shot Jaidee, dumped her corpse on Ofärds and disposed of the rifle in a nearby sea trench.

Season two

Evert suspects Tomas of working with Tina and the Russian mafia. In a drunken state, Evert barges into Tomas's home waving his gun but he discovers Tomas is dead. He goes to the drinks cabinet, where he finds Pinocchio hidden in a wine box. He puts it back and returns to the lounge. Evert notices bullet holes and, with a cloth, picks up another gun. Adam and Kristian enter. He orders them to call in Ankan and Peter. The team analyse the crime scene, shots were fired but Tomas was beaten and strangled. Toivonen removes Evert from this investigation as he had threatened his rival earlier. Ankan appointed to lead. Evert consults Gurra about Pinocchio, which is a unique Fabergé-designed children's musical box owned by Nicholas II and said to be cursed. Its estimated worth is SEK 300 million. Evert decides to hide information about Pinocchio, while tracking down its previous owners. Evert's first suspect, Hans, who was assaulted by Tomas, dies when he falls from his upper storey onto Evert's taxi. Hans's phone shows he was being threatened.

Personal trainer Martin helped transfer Russian icons and Pinocchio for Tomas. He asks Ankan for help but she is sidetracked by girlfriend Carla throwing a surprise birthday party. Martin is attacked and hospitalised. Gurra tells Evert that a Finnish noble family were previous owners of Pinocchio. Evert and Toivonen fly to Helsinki to meet Sigge and his bodyguard Aapo. Evert deduces they confronted Tomas in his home. Tomas shot at them. Aapo and Tomas fought, Tomas was left injured and the Finns departed without the musical box. Ankan suspects Evert is lying about Pinocchio. Russian henchman Boris sends threatening messages to Evert. Ankan and Evert investigate art dealer "Dubrovnik", who accepted offer from Tomas to buy the artefact. Evert misdirects Ankan and Carla. He approaches the seller who drives off. Adam and Kristian discover a stolen bike, which leads to Tomas's recently acknowledged child, Nike. Evert and Ankan determine that Tomas's domestic partner killed him and stole Pinocchio. Ankan recovers it but hands it to Evert. Evert delivers it to Boris's boss Ivan. Boris is about to shoot Evert, but he is saved when Tina kills Boris.

== Cast and characters ==
- Kjell Bergqvist as Evert Bäckström: homicide detective inspector, TV celebrity show Spanning (English: Reconnaissance) panellist, has unsurpassed success in solving cases, disparages superiors, colleagues and rivals
- Agnes Lindström Bolmgren as Annika ”Ankan” Carlsson: Evert's former protégé, serious crimes unit detective, Evert's second-in-charge
- Pekka Strang as Pentti Toivonen: Finnish-ancestry, raised in Södertälje, Stockholm Police Chief, Evert's and Ankan's boss
- Filip Berg as Kristian Olsson: uniformed police transferred to Evert's unit, attempts to woo Ankan
- Peshang Rad as Adam "Olzzon" Oleszkiewicz: uniformed police transferred to Evert's unit
- Małgorzata Pieczyńska as Nadja Högberg: Russian-born forensic pathologist
- Rolf Lydahl as Peter Niemi: crime scene investigator, forensic scientist. Separates from wife
- Elvis Stegmar as Edvin Kostić: Slobodan's son, Evert's neighbour and protégé, amateur sleuth, sea scout. Attempts to reconcile Evert and Tina. Holidays with Evert in Palma
- Victoria Dyrstad as Clara Nord: police detective, Ankan's love interest, Nationella operativa avdelningen (English: National Operations Department) (NOA) agent, separated from Ankan, jailed as murder suspect
- Jens Hultén as Tomas Eriksson: high society lawyer, Spanning panellist, Evert's rival. Killed in season 2 (seasons 1–2)
- Helena Bergström as Teresia "Tussan" Carlsson: Ankan's mother, Eugene's love interest. Returns to Palma, Miguel's lover, becomes Evert's lover (seasons 2–3)
- Helen Sjöholm as Tina Bonde: celebrity manager, including Gurra, Tomas and Evert; becomes Evert's love interest until she betrays him. Saves Evert's life by killing Boris, jailed. (seasons 1–2)
- Anders Mossling as G Gurra (Gustav G:son Henning): high society collectables broker, Evert's associate, star of TV show Antique Dealers (seasons 1–2)
- Arbi Alviati as Boris Borovskij: Russian mafia, "Tsar" Ivan's henchman. Killed by Tina (seasons 1–2)
- Lisa Lindgren as Programledare Spanning (English: Reconnaissance presenter) / Lisa Kvarnström: host of celebrity TV show, Spanning (seasons 1–2)
- Lars G. Wik as Sven "Nudeln" Severin (English: "Noodle" Severin): Lost property officer, demoted for accusing Evert of theft. Dubbed "Noodle" by Evert after he seduced Sven's wife. Seeks revenge against Evert (seasons 1–2)
- Baxter Renman as Unge Evert (English: Young Evert): nine-year-old boy, Sally's neighbour and best friend; finds her corpse (seasons 2–3)

=== Season one only ===
- Livia Millhagen as Hanna Hwass: former Financial Crimes Unit, Deputy Chief Prosecutor appointed to lead Evert's investigation, Erik's daughter
- Linus Wahlgren as Daniel Johnson: Foreign Affairs diplomat, aspirant ambassador, Jaidee's husband, Tomas and Haqvin's friend
- Sandra Yi Sencindiver as Jaidee Kunchai/Jada Jing: Thai-born, Swedish resident, Daniel's wife. Declared dead from December 2004 Asian tsunami in Thailand. Actually killed in mid-2011. Assumed "Jada Jing" identity after tsunami until her death
- Johan Widerberg as Haqvin Furuhjelm: inherited fortune from his arms dealer father, completed law degree, sailor, Edvin's scout leader, Daniel and Tomas's former friend
- Johan Kylén as Gerhard Rönndahl: MiMi's husband, restaurateur
- Vee Vimolmal as Naphaporn: restaurant chef, Gerhard's love interest
- Victor Gadderus as Slobodan Kostić: Edvin's father
- Staffan Göthe as Erik Hwass: Hanna's father, former head of National Criminal Police, which supervised identification of Swedish tsunami victims
- Sahajak Boonthanakit as Akkarat Bunyasarn: Bangkok police Chief Inspector, assists Evert
- Hanna Ullerstam as Anna: Daniel and Jaidee's accountant
- Lars Andersson as Roland "Stålis" Stålhammar: former policeman, Evert's contact

=== Season two only ===
- Lola Zackow as Jannicke Svenzon: news reporter
- Marcus Vögeli as Martin Hansen: personal trainer, Sanna's foster brother and accomplice
- Malin Crépin as Sanna Svärd: lawyer, Martin's foster sister, Tomas's colleague and domestic partner
- Stephen Rappaport as "Dubrovnik": art dealer, offers to buy Pinocchio
- Jens Ohlin as Ronny "Eugene": aspiring writer-poet; Tussan's love interest
- Michael Segerström as Cornelius: lawyer, Tomas's colleague
- Sergej Merkusjev as "Tsar" Ivan: Stockholm Russia mafia boss, pursues Pinocchio
- Peder Falk as Baron Hans Ulrik von Comer: art dealer, king's former friend, Tomas's associate, rival for Pinocchio
- Vega Distner as Sally: eleven-year-old girl, Evert's childhood friend, murdered
- Anna Sise as Lucy Nyström: Nike's mother, electric bike owner
- Adja Krook as Nike Nyström: Lucy and Tomas's daughter, connects with Tomas in his last months
- Jaqueline Ignacio as Ms Anoo: Tomas's major creditor
- Robin Stegmar as Hannes Nyström: Lucy's husband Note: Robin is the father of Elvis Stegmar who portrays Edvin.

=== Season three only ===
- Julia Marko-Nord as Xenia Wall: NOA boss, supervises Palma undercover operation
- Thea Sannert as Sally: Evert's friend, murdered (Note: second actress to portray same character)
- Srdjan Nedzipovski as Miguel Romero: Palma-born, undercover policeman, Tussan's clandestine lover
- Mira Lydahl Bodell as Alice: Peter's daughter, befriends Edvin, Spanish-speaking
- Léonie Vincent as Jennifer p.k.a. "Eliza": Xenia's undercover agent in Albert's gang as Iris's driver, Lisa's clandestine lover
- Görel Crona as Iris Gripensköld: Sally's cousin, reclusive Palma resident, works with nephew Albert
- Mattias Silvell as Karl Mellerud: Swedish celebrity chef, money launderer, drug dealer, works with Albert
- Lia Boysen as Beatrice: Tussan's Swedish-born friend, funds Tussan's golf club project
- Kjell Wilhelmsen as Lasse K: money launderer, works for Beatrice
- Panos Koronis as Detective Morales: Palma's police, investigates Miguel's murder
- Yannis Kokiasmenos as Padre Buñuel: local priest, Miguel's confidate
- Nikos Poursanidis as Ricardo Costa: Miguel's cousin, runs nightclub as front for money laundering and drug dealing
- Francisco Sobrado as Conny Stångberg (né Radić): Former gangster, Stockholm lawyer, restaurant owner, buys restaurants soon after they were blown up
- Christoffer Aigevi as Albert Örn (a.k.a. Orel (Czech); Eagle (English)): Swedish-born drug lord, based in Palma, works with his aunt Iris
- Carita Ivanova as Elizabeth "Lisa" Radić: Södertälje-born to Czech parents, Conny's sister, shot in back by Orel (English: Eagle), Jennifer's clandestine lover
- Maria Nefeli Douka as Ana Costa: Ricardo's wife

== Production ==
Bäckström was produced by Yellow Bird Productions for C More and TV4 in co-production with Film i Väst and ARD Degeto. Banijay Rights distributed the series internationally. The first season's directors are Jonathan Sjöberg and Amanda Adolfsson. Sjöberg is also the main scriptwriter while Dennis Magnusson has co-written two of episodes. Georgie Mathew is the producer. It consists of six episodes, based on Leif G. W. Persson's books Kan man dö två gånger? (2016) (English: Can You Die Twice?) and parts of Den som dödar draken (2008) (English: The One Who Kills the Dragon). It was filmed in Gothenburg and Bangkok.

Second season of six episodes was directed by Andreas Öhman and Manuel Concha with three each. Filming began in early 2021 in Gothenburg and Stockholm. It is based on Persson's book, Den sanna historien om Pinocchios näsa (2013) (English: The True Story of Pinocchio's Nose). Scripts were co-written by Magnusson and Sjöberg.

== Reception ==
Joel Keller of Decider reviewed Bäckström season one and praised Bergqvist's portrayal of the titular character, "[not] as a crank or a grump but as a guy who is fascinated with murder, thinks finding out who killed a person is one of the most important things to do, and seems to have an overall lust for life." Keller also considered Stegmar's role of Edvin, "a bit of a precocious snot-nose, but the kid is the only character besides Bäckström that has any sort of personality." What She Said Talk's Anne Brodie also considered it, "a nifty, new detective series" and observed that Bergqvist's character's "hidden talent, believe it or not, is empathy... He 'feels' situations that sometimes lead him to clues."

== Episodes ==
=== Season one ===
| No. overall | No. in season | Title | Directed by | Written by | Based on | Original release date |
|---|---|---|---|---|---|---|
| 1 | 1 | "Episode 1" | Jonathan Sjöberg | Leif G. W. Persson, Jonathan Sjöberg | Kan man dö två gånger? | 23 March 2020 |
Armoured van stopped by four thieves. One holds the guards hostage. Others blow open van's rear door. Thief removes selected cases; another grabs moneybag. Guard sets off dye bomb and runs; other guard's are shot. Evert refuses robbery investigation. Edvin ran away from scout camp after finding a human skull on Ofärds Island. Evert asks Ankan to join his investigation but Ankan remains at robbery scene. Edvin describes skull: East Asian, adult female. Edvin directs Evert, Ankan and Peter to skull's site. Peter finds .22 calibre bullet. Evert requests more personnel to search Ofärds. Edvin's parents holidaying in Croatia. Evert annoyed when Toivonen assigns two injured uniformed officers, Kristian and Adam. Evert estimates death occurred 5-10 years earlier. Evert advises Edvin to use nightmares to help sort his memories. Evert describes finding Sally's corpse. Kristian and Adam research possible victims. Haqvin recalls being on Ofärds in childhood but cannot remember when last there. After Evert denigrates robbery investigation on TV, Toivonen appoints Hanna to supervise Evert's investigation. Evert and Peter find rest of skeleton in a root cellar, confirming her death is not suicide. Gurra details Haqvin's rich playboy life. Nadja: skull's DNA is Jaidee's, but Jaidee died in Thailand in December 2004.
| 2 | 2 | "Episode 2" | Jonathan Sjöberg | Leif G. W. Persson, Jonathan Sjöberg | Kan man dö två gånger? | 23 March 2020 |
2004: Daniel wakes Jaidee; he leaves to buy newspaper. Daniel sees tsunami approaching. Present: Hanna vetoes Evert's decision to interrogate Daniel. Hanna orders another skull DNA test. Nadja contacts Akkarat about Jaidee's death. Ankan and Evert attend Jari's corpse; he has been shot dead. Ankan finds blue dye on Jari: he's an armoured van thief. Adam investigates Gerhard, who reported MiMi missing. Evert misdirects Ankan as he questions Stålis, who names Jari's former cellmate, Boris as his accomplice. Evert tells Ankan "Tsar"'s behind robbery. Peter's forensic team find canned sausages on Ofärds. While Evert's on Spaning, Stålis retracts his accusation. Gurra updates Evert on Hanna's clean work history. Evert meets Tina. Tomas tells Hanna that Evert's corrupt; advises Hanna to dump Evert. Kristian outlines Daniel and Jaidee's romance and business dealings. Daniel raised by his stepfather; both liked sailing. Nadja: Jaidee's body was cremated; not returned to Sweden. Evert and Ankan interview Daniel, who confirms Jaidee's tsunami death. Reading body language, Evert disbelieves Daniel. Evert and Edvin prepare dinner for Tina. Hanna asks Tomas for evidence of Evert's corruption. Clara to Ankan: Boris under surveillance. Anna describes Jaidee's funeral, remembers seeing Jaidee's infinity tattoo. Hanna prevents Evert from further questioning Anna.
| 3 | 3 | "Episode 3" | Jonathan Sjöberg | Leif G. W. Persson, Jonathan Sjöberg | Kan man dö två gånger? | 30 March 2020 |
Bangkok: Evert meets Akkarat, who has already contacted Jaidee and MiMi's relatives. Akkarat introduces former bellhop, who describes finding Jaidee's corpse in collapsed bungalow. Daniel became overwrought over her death. Evert dines with Akkarat's family. Stockholm: Ankan and Clara tail Boris. Ankan places tracker on his car. Adam hypothesises: Gerhard killed MiMi for stealing from restaurant. Edvin learns Evert's in Thailand. Edvin photographs case board: notices canned sausages, which Haqvin liked, were discovered. Kristian assigned to lost property for subverting Hanna's instructions. Adam meets Severin, Kristian to Adam: Gerhard pays money to MiMi's family. Bangkok: Evert and Akkarat meet MiMi's family; they are being paid off. Evert finds tattooist, who worked on Jaidee's symbol. Jaidee's mother confirms seeing daughter's corpse. Evert and Akkarat collect hotel's logs for night before tsunami. They trace Jaidee's last day to a nightclub. Stockholm: Ankan tracks Boris to warehouse; "Tsar" expected there on Wednesday. Hanna notifies NOA's chief of Jaidee's anomalous DNA result. Chief tells Hanna that Eric supervised Swedish identifications after tsunami. Hanna asks Ankan for evidence of Evert's corruption. Adam and Kristian arrest Gerhard. Bangkok: Evert phones Tina: tells her of an impending raid. Evert realises Jaidee was impersonated; someone else died instead of Jaidee.
| 4 | 4 | "Episode 4" | Amanda Adolfsson | Leif G. W. Persson, Dennis Magnusson, Jonathan Sjöberg | Kan man dö två gånger? | 6 April 2020 |
Evert returns to Stockholm, meets Tina. Ankan coordinates warehouse raid: it is fruitless; "Tsar" was warned. Tomas tells Hanna that "Noodle" witnessed Evert's stealing. Evert and Tina have sex. At work, Evert airs his body swap hypothesis for insurance fraud. Evert and Hanna question Gerhard. MiMi stole and left. Gerhard: Naphaporn became chef. MiMi's alive in Denmark. Ankan follows Evert to Russian restaurant. Boris enters after. Hanna's notified DNA matches Jaidee. Anna: Daniel and Jaidee wanted threesome with tall, dark Asian woman. Ankan shows Toivonen photos of Evert and Boris entering same restaurant. "Noodle" tells Hanne that he refuses to tackle Evert, again. Hanna views video of Evert taking art works from crime scene. Toivonen suspends Evert; uniformed police escort him out. Edvin tells Ankan about Haqvin's preference for canned sausages. Akkarat informs Evert of bar girl, Jada, who left nightclub with Daniel and Jaidee. Edvin breaks into Haqvin's room at campsite: finds photos. Haqvin chases him. Evert learns that second skull DNA test matches Jaidee. Evert surmises that Daniel and Jaidee both survived tsunami but their sex partner Jada died wearing Jaidee's jewellery and infinity tattoo. They swapped identities for Jaidee's life insurance. Daniel supplied Jaidee's comb. Someone kidnaps Edvin.
| 5 | 5 | "Episode 5" | Amanda Adolfsson | Leif G. W. Persson, Dennis Magnusson, Jonathan Sjöberg | Kan man dö två gånger? | 13 April 2020 |
Edvin, on cellphone, provides clues for Evert and Tina. Edvin escapes kidnapper's car. Kidnapper steals Edvin's backpack. Evert and Hanna listen as Edvin describes his ordeal; supplies his phone's photos. One shows Haqvin and Jaidee on yacht. Tina overhears Evert and Hanna argue about Evert stealing artwork. Hanna updates team on Jaidee's DNA, Daniel's fraud. However, Daniel's away on business. Clara's team reports Boris does not contact "Tsar". Evert gives Tina his door's passkey. Evert and Edvin go to scout camp. Hanna learns "Noodle" did not send video. Stålis to Ankan: someone else betrayed her raid. Police interview Daniel's stepsister, Sara. Sara remembers Daniel joined scouts. Hanna finds Tomas sent video; his client defraud insurance items, which Evert collected. Camp's caretaker shows Haqvin's room to Evert. Ankan questions restaurant staff: Evert met woman; Boris sat elsewhere. Edvin lures Haqvin to his yacht. Evert confronts him about knowing Jaidee. Haqvin denies killing or burying Jaidee. He escapes but caretaker knocks-out Haqvin. Caretaker identifies Daniel, Haqvin and Tomas as former friends. Hanna confronts Tomas. Tomas has Edvin's backpack. Evert surprised by Russian mafia: accept bribe or die. Evert feigns cowardice, knocks down Boris, shoots others. Tina returns Evert's passkey and leaves.
| 6 | 6 | "Episode 6" | Amanda Adolfsson | Leif G. W. Persson, Dennis Magnusson, Jonathan Sjöberg | Kan man dö två gånger? | 20 April 2020 |
On Spaning, Evert re-enacts fighting off mafia. Evert returns to investigation; directs Ankan to continue robbery investigation. Kristian and Nadja detail how Daniel and "Jada" travelled same flights until mid-2011. Haqvin claims photo of him and Jaidee was from 2004. Evert learned Ankan reported him to Toivonen. Police detain Daniel; he is represented by Tomas. Flashback: young Daniel, Tomas and Haqvin pledge loyalty to each other. Present: Tomas asks for evidence of Daniel's crimes. Insurance fraud crimes are time-barred. Evert and Hanna question Daniel's stepfather, who confirms Daniel borrowed boat and lost stepfather's rifle. Haqvin admits seeing Daniel and Jaidee in mid-2011. Heard Jaidee, Tomas and Daniel arguing over money. Jaidee wanted to see her mother. Peter to Evert: Daniel's boat destroyed. Peter reveals trench search due tomorrow as Tomas, Daniel and Haqvin leave. Police stakeout dive location; catch Daniel surfacing with rifle in bag. Flashback: Daniel and Jaidee argue, she prepares to leave. Present: Daniel confesses to hiding her body and rifle but not to killing Jaidee. He claims Jaidee killed herself. Ankan to Evert: Tina betrayed him to Russians. Court finds Daniel not proven of murder beyond reasonable doubt. Daniel's convicted of unlawful burial. Evert allows Tina to leave.

=== Season two ===
| No. overall | No. in season | Title | Directed by | Written by | Based on | Original release date |
|---|---|---|---|---|---|---|
| 7 | 1 | "Episode 1" | Andreas Öhman | Leif G. W. Persson, Dennis Magnusson, Jonathan Sjöberg | Den sanna historien om Pinocchios näsa | 28 February 2022 |
Russia, Easter 1908: Prince Alexei finds Pinocchio-shaped musical box. Alexei bleeding, Nicholas II screams. Stockholm, present: Kristian and Adam arrive at crime scene: Evert, holding gun, Tomas dead. Two days earlier: Evert refuses working with Tomas on Spaning. Evert called to death scene. Peter: its suicide. However, Evert reveals killer hiding in blanket box. Evert shows headline: solved in 60 seconds. Ankan interviews Boris, who briefly responds: whoever lies, dies. Witness observes Tomas assaulting Hans. Ankan and Clara dine with Tussan and Eugene. Ankan films Tomas begging Tina for help. Toivonen assigns Hans's assault to Evert. Evert notices Peter has marital problems. Tina practises gun shooting. Evert orders Ankan not to question Tina. Tomas asks Anoo for more time. Ankan intrudes, Anoo leaves. Tomas to Ankan: considering new agent. Ankan hears tune on Tomas's phone. Boris escapes transfer vehicle; helped by motorcyclist. Ivan and Boris toast to Pinocchio. Evert accuses Tina of colluding with Tomas and Ivan. Evert finds Tomas dead in his home. Goes to drinks cabinet, finds Pinocchio in carton. Collects another gun with cloth. Counts bullet holes. Kristian and Adam enter. Evert orders: call Peter and Ankan. Flashback: Nicholas orders cursed Pinocchio destroyed.
| 8 | 2 | "Episode 2" | Andreas Öhman | Leif G. W. Persson, Dennis Magnusson, Jonathan Sjöberg | Den sanna historien om Pinocchios näsa | 28 February 2022 |
Evert and team analyse crime scene. They find three of four bullets fired. Tomas assaulted and strangled. Kristian finds dead dog. Evert invites Peter to stay with him. Toivonen removes Evert from case due to threatening Tomas. Gurra describes Hans spurned by king. Evert takes Hans's assault case. Various celebrities eulogise Tomas. Hans claims head wound caused by bicycle accident, denies visiting Tomas previous night. Tomas's neighbour saw visitor arrive last afternoon. Ankan queries Sanna: afternoon visitor could be Martin. Evert trashes Tomas's reputation to waiting media. Peter asks Edvin about Sally's death but Evert cuts him off. Martin to Ankan: took icons to Tomas, later drove Cornelius to gym. Adam and Kristian unlock Tomas's home; they hear noise and stop two teens stealing beer. Tina denies any involvement in Tomas's death. DNA evidence shows Tomas assaulted Hans. Gurra tells Evert: Pinocchio's worth SEK 300 million. Evert and Ankan return to Tomas's. Evert cannot find Pinocchio. Hans frightened by message. Lisa fires Evert from Spaning for denigrating Tomas. Evert believes Hans stole Pinocchio. When Evert arrives Hans falls onto his taxi, dead. Murderer drives off. Tina tells Ankan: it is all about Pinocchio. Ankan searches Boris's room, he drew Evert as Pinocchio.
| 9 | 3 | "Episode 3" | Andreas Öhman | Leif G. W. Persson, Dennis Magnusson, Jonathan Sjöberg | Den sanna historien om Pinocchios näsa | 7 March 2022 |
Hans chased upstairs; either jumped or pushed to his death. Pinocchio's tune plays on Hans's phone; received threats each hour. Gurra details Pinocchio's provenance from Fabergé's presentation to Nicholas II to Swedish king in 1958. Ankan mentions Pinocchio; Evert dismisses it as irrelevant. Team focuses on Russian icons. Nadja discovers icons sent from Helsinki. Gurra describes Toivonen's ancestor guarding king's Finnish guests, Blåfields, when Pinocchio disappeared. Evert queries Toivonen about current Blåfield: Sigge. He owned icons, later at Tomas's. Evert and Toivonen meet Sigge and bodyguard, Aapo. Edvin describes how Pinocchio stopped lying to become real boy. Martin concerned upon learning Hans died. Evert uses Sigge to demonstrate liars' traits. Martin phones Ankan for help but she has diverted as Clara throws surprise party. Evert to Sigge: Tomas had Russians steal Pinocchio from van. Hans blackmailed Tomas, phoned Sigge who had Aapo threaten Tomas. Martin messages Ankan: tell you about Pinocchio. Ankan leaves party as Eugene recites banal poetry. Tomas waved gun at Aapo and Sigge. Tomas and Aapo struggled with gun, shots fired, one hit Aapo's vest. Tomas injured but alive. Car crashes into Martin's car but he escapes. Ankan arrives at scene, hears shots. Shooter runs off, Martin seriously wounded.
| 10 | 4 | "Episode 4" | Manuel Concha | Leif G. W. Persson, Dennis Magnusson, Jonathan Sjöberg | Den sanna historien om Pinocchios näsa | 14 March 2022 |
Sanna to Ankan: do not know about Pinocchio. Clara and Ankan argue about her guilt over Martin. Ankan to Evert: Tina mentioned Pinocchio. Cornelius: Tomas in debt but recently more cheerful. At law firm, Ankan finds Tomas's electronic diary: met "N" on last day. Tomas owed Anoo millions. Kristian tails Anoo to restaurant; Anoo meets Cornelius. Ankan asks for Anoo's DNA. Kristian plucks Anoo's hair. Anoo: Tomas had repayment plan. Anoo's DNA does not match crime scene. Adam recalls bike abandoned near Tomas's home. Evert insults "Noodle" for hiding bike details. Lucy claims bike stolen; her DNA matches crime scene. Lucy and Tomas had been lovers before marriage to Hannes. Nike confesses meeting Tomas on night he died. Flashback: Nike shows Lucy's diary to Tomas. Lucy became pregnant but never told Tomas. Nike met Tomas weekly. Lucy followed Nike, argued with Tomas, they left. Present: Ankan reads Tomas's email from "Dobrovnik": agree to SEK270 million. "Noodle" to Jannicke on TV: Evert at Tomas's death scene; Evert steals artworks. Gurra details "Dubrovnik" returning next day. Evert and Tussan meet; Tussan's returning to Spain. Edvin arranged Tina and Evert's meeting. Boris message to Evert: Give us Pinocchio or die, you have 24 hours.
| 11 | 5 | "Episode 5" | Manuel Concha | Leif G. W. Persson, Dennis Magnusson, Jonathan Sjöberg | Den sanna historien om Pinocchios näsa | 21 March 2022 |
Evert receives hourly threats; Pinocchio's tune plays. Boris tails Evert. Ankan and team monitor "Dubrovnik" entering hotel room. Evert updates Gurra. Carla bugs "Dubrovnik"'s room. Ankan and Evert attend auction. "Dubrovnik" receives call, meets Gurra. Evert becomes desperate: begs Tina to contact "Tsar". Tina tells "Tsar": Evert does not have Pinocchio. "Tsar" wants Pinocchio to bribe Russian president, gain amnesty and return. Tina gives Evert bad news: deadline remains. Peter and Edvin created diorama of Sally's environs, where she died according to police reports. Evert overturns diorama; after ranting at Peter, he leaves. Gurra enters "Dubrovnik"'s room and sells something, then leaves. Ankan and Kristian tail Gurra. Carla and Evert follow "Dubrovnik". Gurra goes to farm, "Dubrovnik" stops at roadside rest area. "Dubrovnik" collects phone from picnic bench. Carla arrests "Dubrovnik". Evert drives off in "Dubrovnik"'s car. Ankan and Kristian stop Gurra, who carries portable record player. Boris enters Evert's building to set bomb. Peter tells Edvin that Evert misremembered Sally, allowing him to deal with her death. Evert approaches meeting point without waiting for Ankan. Evert enters shipping container, seller drives off. Evert follows. Ankan and team arrive, container is empty. Evert approaches his building; bomb explodes on his floor.
| 12 | 6 | "Episode 6" | Manuel Concha | Leif G. W. Persson, Dennis Magnusson, Jonathan Sjöberg | Den sanna historien om Pinocchios näsa | 28 March 2022 |
Evert rushes upstairs, yelling for Edvin. Peter and Edvin safe on upper floor. Evert goes to hotel. Evert tells Ankan: Russians want him dead. "Dubrovnik" describes Pinocchio: priceless Fabergé music box. Tomas's accomplice asked same price. Kristian and Evert check gym's CCTV verifying Cornelius and Martin's alibis. Evert checks CCTV of gym's rear: Cornelius and Martin leaving. Cornelius was cheating on his wife, using Martin as alibi. Ankan confronts Evert with his lies: knew about Pinocchio since Tomas's death. Evert and Ankan visit Martin. Martin can only blink; they learn Martin returned to Tomas's: Pinocchio gone. Ankan and Evert evaluate death scene; deduce that Sanna took Pinocchio. Ankan drives Evert to Tomas's funeral. Upon approach, Sanna grabs Nike at gunpoint. Sanna shoots Ankan's vest. Evert arrests Sanna. Ankan, Evert and Toivonen search Sanna's place. Ankan finds storage keys: gives them to Evert so he can save himself. Evert phones Tina: tell "Tsar" he has item. Evert and Boris enter storage area, open locker. "Tsar" collects Pinocchio; Boris prepares to kill Evert. Tina kills Boris, defending Evert. Cornelius becomes Tina's lawyer, Jannicke gets an exclusive: Tina's life story. Ankan and Tussan reconcile. Tussan leaves Eugene. Lisa welcomes Evert back to Spaning.

=== Season three ===
| No. overall | No. in season | Title | Directed by | Written by | Original release date |
|---|---|---|---|---|---|
| 13 | 1 | "Operation Palma" | Jonathan Sjöberg | Leif G.W. Persson, Jonathan Sjöberg, Dennis Magnusson | 24 April 2024 |
Evert, Peter, Edvin and Alice fly to Palma. Evert wants to interview Iris. Hooded figure bombs restaurant. Toivonen announces Evert started investigation. Evert feigns illness. Ankan and team interview witnesses and review CCTV. Tussan and Miguel argue over golf course project. Miguel takes Tussan's keys. Tussan installs Evert's group into rooms. Iris's and Sally's fathers clashed over their father's estate. Miguel speaks to Buñuel. Albert to Evert: Iris not home. Evert finds Miguel's corpse in pool. Helsinki explosions linked to Tälje-based drug cartel. Morales warns Evert not to interfere. Clara screams upon seeing Miguel's corpse; tells Evert to contact Xenia. Evert apprises Xenia of Miguel's death, Clara's arrest. Alice asks Edvin to start a detective club; solve Miguel's murder. Tussan: Miguel and Clara arrived two months ago. Peter analyses pool water. Edvin and Alice hear police found blood in Clara's flat. Xenia in Palma; explains undercover operation on Albert's drug gang. Tussan cleans room, notices keys missing. Flashback: Evert and Sally free horses during barn fire. Evert knocked out. Present: Alice to Edvin; her parents are divorcing. They swim with Peter. Evert asks Beatrice to introduce him to Iris. Ankan arrives. Xenia updates Evert: Eliza's missing. Ankan visits Clara.
| 14 | 2 | "Dolores" | Jonathan Sjöberg | Leif G.W. Persson, Jonathan Sjöberg, Dennis Magnusson | 24 April 2024 |
Carla: Miguel said remember Dolores. Peter cuts wire to access Miguel's room, which Spanish police had sealed. Tussan recovers her keys. Alice and Edvin follow Lasse. Evert discovers Tussan's dress. Tussan unlocks balcony door. Evert finds nightclub receipt. Evert deceives Toivonen: on way home. Children alert Evert and Peter to intruder: Alice draws his picture. Eliza notified of Miguel's death. Xenia organises phone drop. Eliza drives Iris to port and is introduced to Karl. Ankan and Evert notice Eliza's being watched. They follow Eliza's car to isolated hangar. Eliza carries bag inside. Evert enters rear door. Eliza drops bag for Lasse, who gives her envelope. Karl and Iris are laundering money. Evert sees unmasked Lasse drive off. Xenia introduces Eliza to team. Eliza defines Albert's trade routes; nightclub owned by Ricardo. Eliza recalls Miguel and Ricardo argued. Kristian photographs Conny near restaurant. Ankan calls Kristian and Adam: join them in Palma. Evert recognises Lasse from Alice's drawing. Edvin shows film: Tussan accesses Miguel's room. Toivonen enters, packs Evert's bags; they scuffle. Adam and Kristian arrive. Eliza messages Xenia: shipment due. Tussan admits Miguel was her lover. Ankan meets Ricardo at nightclub. Evert and Tussan have sex. Lasse searches room.
| 15 | 3 | "Costa" | David Berron | Leif G.W. Persson, Jonathan Sjöberg, Dennis Magnusson | 24 April 2024 |
Flashback: Evert wakes in hospital; grandmother warns against Sally. Present: Tussan asks Beatrice to bring Iris to golf course opening. Evert to Toivonen: must solve Sally's case before retirement. Adam takes job at Ricardo's nightclub. Adam recovers photo from office: Miguel caught snooping. Tussan takes Evert ot Ricardo's home. Evert plants bug; they hear Ricardo and Ana argue: Ricardo left before Miguel murdered. Evert attends Tussan's project opening; Beatrice brings Iris. Iris evades Evert. Xenia stops Peter's wife scolding him over not returning Alice. Peter and Xenia bring children on stakeout. Adam sees Ricardo and Karl argue about Miguel's phone. Flashback: Evert and Sally view favourite painting. Sally's father argues with her uncle. After Evert returned home, found Sally dead. Present: Iris: Sally played detective; searched for arsonist. Years later Iris's father and younger brother died. Albert finalised estate's sale. Iris moved to Palma. Ricardo sees Kristian leave surveillance. Ankan catches Evert and Tussan abed. Ana phones Evert: Ricardo hunting Karl with gun. Ankan drives Evert. Ricardo asks Eliza for Karl but he is gone. Xenia reports Ricardo drove from Iris's. Ankan and Evert phone Ricardo: do not kill Karl. Ricardo stops. Ankan and Evert arrive, Ricardo has been shot dead.
| 16 | 4 | "Bäckströms blodröda (Bäckström's Blood Red)" | Jonathan Sjöberg | Leif G.W. Persson, Jonathan Sjöberg, Dennis Magnusson | 24 April 2024 |
Morales and team attend Ricardo's corpse. Ankan shows video of Karl threatening Ricardo; Karl arrested. Evert and Ankan inform Ricardo's family. Iris provides alibi: Karl's released. Eliza says she stayed with Iris; Karl not there. Evert and Tussan visit Karl's winery, ask for exclusive wine. Evert discovers where Miguel photographed. Tussan reports gardener recognised Ricardo. Eliza delivers Iris to Karl at hangar. Xenia informed shipment due on Saturday; Miguel had incriminating recording. Evert reveals to Ankan that Tussan was nicknamed Delores by Miguel. Ankan and Kristian have heartfelt discussion. Masked man attacks Ana. Evert visits Ana, who returns his bug. Ankan and Kristian have sex. Morales to Ankan: blood and murder weapon in Carla's flat. Evert and team at Karl's winery pretending to launch Evert's own wine. Peter takes soil sample, Evert and Adam find drug-processing lab. Adam to Toivonen: drugs imported inside wine casks. Toivonen: Adam and Kristian to return and follow up Adam's idea. Lasse questions Buñuel about Miguel. Edvin and Alice describe suspicions about Tussan with Ankan. Buñuel's learns Miguel was murdered, Clara jailed. Lasse follows Buñuel. Morales: Miguel killed by golf club. Evert realises Miguel was killed at Tussan's project. Both Evert and Ankan suspect Tussan.
| 17 | 5 | "Vän eller fiende (Friend or Foe)" | David Berron | Leif G.W. Persson, Jonathan Sjöberg, Dennis Magnusson | 24 April 2024 |
Evert and Ankan learn Tussan's project stopped by court order. Xenia informs Morales of expected drug delivery. Lasse follows Buñuel to police station. Ankan and Evert discover Miguel contested golf course sale. Xenia tasks Eliza to discover where delivery due. Buñuel to Clara: Miguel's message Porta de Luna. Clara updates Xenia: boat Dolores in port. Ankan confronts Tussan about Miguel disputing golf course ownership. Tussan drives off. Karl orders Eliza to follow. Ankan collects Evert and tails Tussan to Miguel's grandmother. Lasse kidnaps Buñuel, organised prisoner to grab Carla. Lasse, on phone, demands Miguel's message or Buñuel shot. Ankan and Evert accuse Tussan Miguel's murder. When they mention Dolores, grandmother shows Miguel's boat, Dolores. Xenia, Morales and police at port. Nadja: Albert delivers wines to Karl's restaurants. Conny buys blown up restaurants for rival cartel. Adam and Kristian tail Conny, who visits Lisa. The siblings plot against Orel. Xenia and Morales see Evert and Tussan approach Dolores. Carla phones Xenia: forced to reveal about Dolores. Karl searches but Ankan already recovered USB. Eliza and Karl collect drug truckload. USB has recording of Iris and Beatrice discussing money laundering via Tussan's golf course. At Beatrice's instruction, Lasse aims gun at Buñuel.
| 18 | 6 | "Örnen har landat (Eagle Has Landed)" | Jonathan Sjöberg | Leif G.W. Persson, Jonathan Sjöberg, Dennis Magnusson | 24 April 2024 |
Tussan plays audio recording for Beatrice. Beatrice saw Conny drive away from Miguel. Eliza does not recognise Conny. Kristian: Conny in Stockholm when Ricardo died. Ankan: two murderers. Toivonen plants bug in Conny's car. Karl denies murder accusations, gets into car, which explodes. Morales: Karl's alibi confirmed by Iris's neighbours. Evert tells Ankan: one person killed Miguel, Ricardo and Karl. Evert describes how Eliza killed each for Conny. Iris promotes Eliza to Karl's position. Xenia disbelieves Eliza's message: drugs at winery. Flashback: Evert to Sally: I love you. Before Sally can reply they see stables afire. Present: Police listen as Conny requests confirmation once Orel's finished. Nadja: Lisa shot by Orel. Toivonen and team arrest Conny and Lisa. At winery, Eliza's wants to kill Albert for crippling Lisa. Eliza sets fire to drugs. Eliza points gun at Albert but Evert shoots her. Albert is trapped by debris. Evert saves both Eliza and Albert. Xenia reads news to Eliza: Albert and Iris arrested. Carla's released. Ankan tells Carla she loves Kristian. Evert and team search Albert's warehouse. Alice finds Sally's trunk. Imagination: Sally reminds Evert he knows culprit: Sally's uncle. Reality: Evert finds Sally's notebook: she declared her love for Evert.
