= Fia Backström =

Swedish artist, writer and educator

Fia Backström (born 1970) is a Swedish artist, writer and educator known for her multidisciplinary artworks. Backström lives and works in New York City.

== Career ==
Backström's art practice embraces both relational and conceptual art. Her output ranges among event production, exhibitions, magazine ads, posters and conversations.

In 2005, Backström staged the exhibition lesser new york in response to the MoMA PS1 exhibition Greater New York. The salon des refusés-style exhibition was later shown as part of the official Greater New York exhibition at MoMa PS1.

In 2011, she represented Sweden in the Venice Biennale.

Backström's work is included in the collection of the Whitney Museum of American Art, the Rhode Island School of Design Museum and the Moderna Museet.

In 2018, she was awarded a Prix littéraire Bernard Heidsieck–Centre Pompidou.

Fia Backström’s The Great Society was exhibited at the Queens Museum, New York, from September 13, 2025, to May 17, 2026. The exhibit featured photographs, videos and textiles and "explores how communities take shape and survive in the face of converging environmental and extractive crises."
