= Dick van Dyke (politician) =

American politician (1931–1986)

Member of the Washington House of Representatives from the 39th district
- In office January 14, 1985 – December 2, 1986
- Preceded by: Charles Moon
- Succeeded by: Art Sprenkle

Personal details
- Born: Richard Gerard van Dyke; August 27, 1931 Richmond Hill, New York, US
- Died: December 2, 1986 (aged 55) Bothell, Washington, US
- Party: Republican

Richard Gerard van Dyke (August 27, 1931 – December 2, 1986) was an American politician in the state of Washington. He served in the Washington House of Representatives from 1985 to 1986 for District 39. Van Dyke was from Bothell, Washington and defeated incumbent representative Bill Miller in the 1984 elections by 197 votes. He was defeated for re-election in 1986, and in failing health due to diabetes, died by suicide from carbon monoxide poisoning on December 2, 1986.
