= Henry Backstrom =

American politician (1897–1987)

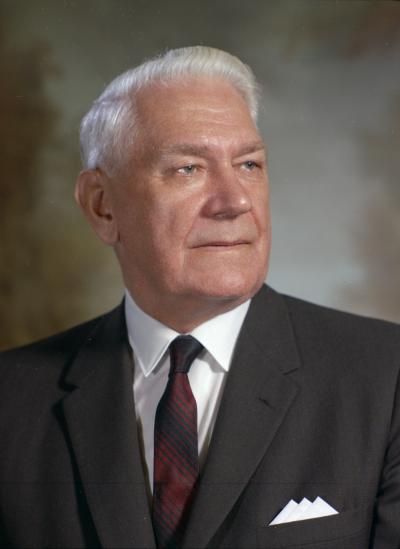
- Backstrom in 1967

Member of the Washington House of Representatives from the 39th district
- In office January 12, 1959 – January 8, 1973
- Preceded by: Herb Hanson
- Succeeded by: Charles Moon

Personal details
- Born: July 31, 1897 New Britain, Connecticut, U.S.
- Died: December 17, 1988 (aged 91) Washington, U.S.
- Party: Democratic

Henry G. Backstrom (July 31, 1897 – December 17, 1987) was an American politician in the state of Washington. He served in the Washington House of Representatives from 1959 to 1973.
