= SOS Alarm =

Partly state-owned company operating the emergency number 112 in Sweden

SOS Alarm Sverige Aktiebolag
- Trade name: SOS Alarm
- Formerly: SOSAB SOS Alarmering AB
- Type: State-owned private limited company
- Industry: Emergency services
- Predecessor: Samhällets olycksfalls- och säkerhetstjänst (1956-1973)
- Founded: 1973
- Founder: Government of Sweden; Municipalities of Sweden; County councils of Sweden
- Headquarters: Stockholm, Sweden
- Area served: Sweden
- Key people: Eva Fernvall Markstedt (Chairman of the Board); Maria Khorsand (CEO)
- Services: 112
- Revenue: ▲1.082 billion SEK (2017)
- Operating income: ▲95.165 million SEK (2017)
- Net income: ▲74.328 million SEK (2017)
- Total assets: ▼596.78 million SEK (2017)
- Total equity: ▲275.256 million SEK (2017)
- Owner: Government of Sweden (50%); Swedish Association of Local Authorities and Regions (50%)
- Number of employees: 1003 (2017)
- Website: SOSalarm.se
- Footnotes: Organization number: 556159-5819; Statistics from 2017 financial statements

SOS Alarm Sverige AB is a Swedish publicly owned company that operates emergency number 112 in Sweden. The enterprise is owned equally by the Government of Sweden and the Swedish Association of Local Authorities and Regions.

== History ==
SOS Alarm has its origin in a state investigation regarding the rural telephone automation from 1944. There it was proposed that telephonists should remain at certain switchboard stations even if they were automated. The telephonists would then be able to connect subscribers to the doctor, police, fire brigade, and similar services.

After several lengthy state investigations, it was decided in 1956 that the SOS service should be introduce. At this point of time "SOS" is an initialism of "Samhällets olycksfalls- och säkerhetstjänst" or "The community's accident and security service". Calling number 90 00 00 was chosen, which later was changed to 90 000. The number was chosen because it was easy to remember and unlikely to be dialed by mistake (as the numbers 0 and 9 were on opposite side of the rotary dial). Today the emergency number is 112.

The first SOS central opened 1956 in Gothenburg. The year after, several others opened in Jönköping, Uppsala, and Östersund. The capital Stockholm got their SOS central in 1958.

At the start the SOS service was a referral service where the telephonist forwarded the person in need to respective emergency service according to various lists with on-call doctors and similar. With time the service expanded to also include fire brigades and ambulances.

When the subscriber dialed "90 000" on their phone, the number was converted in the telephone exchanges and the telephonist received the call as "90 7XX". The two last digits represented the network junction the call came from, and thereby from which general area the call was made.

In 1973 the responsibility for emergency calls was transferred to SOS Alarm, with the state, the Local Authorities Association (Kommunförbundet), and County Council Association (Landstingsförbundet) as owners. The company name at this time was SOSAB, but it was later changed to SOS Alamering AB, and then its current name SOS Alarm Sverige AB. The company was financed with appropriations up until December 1994 and became in 1995 a for-profit company.

On June 1, 1996, the then-current emergency number 90 000 was replaced with the pan-European emergency number 112

=== 90 000 ===
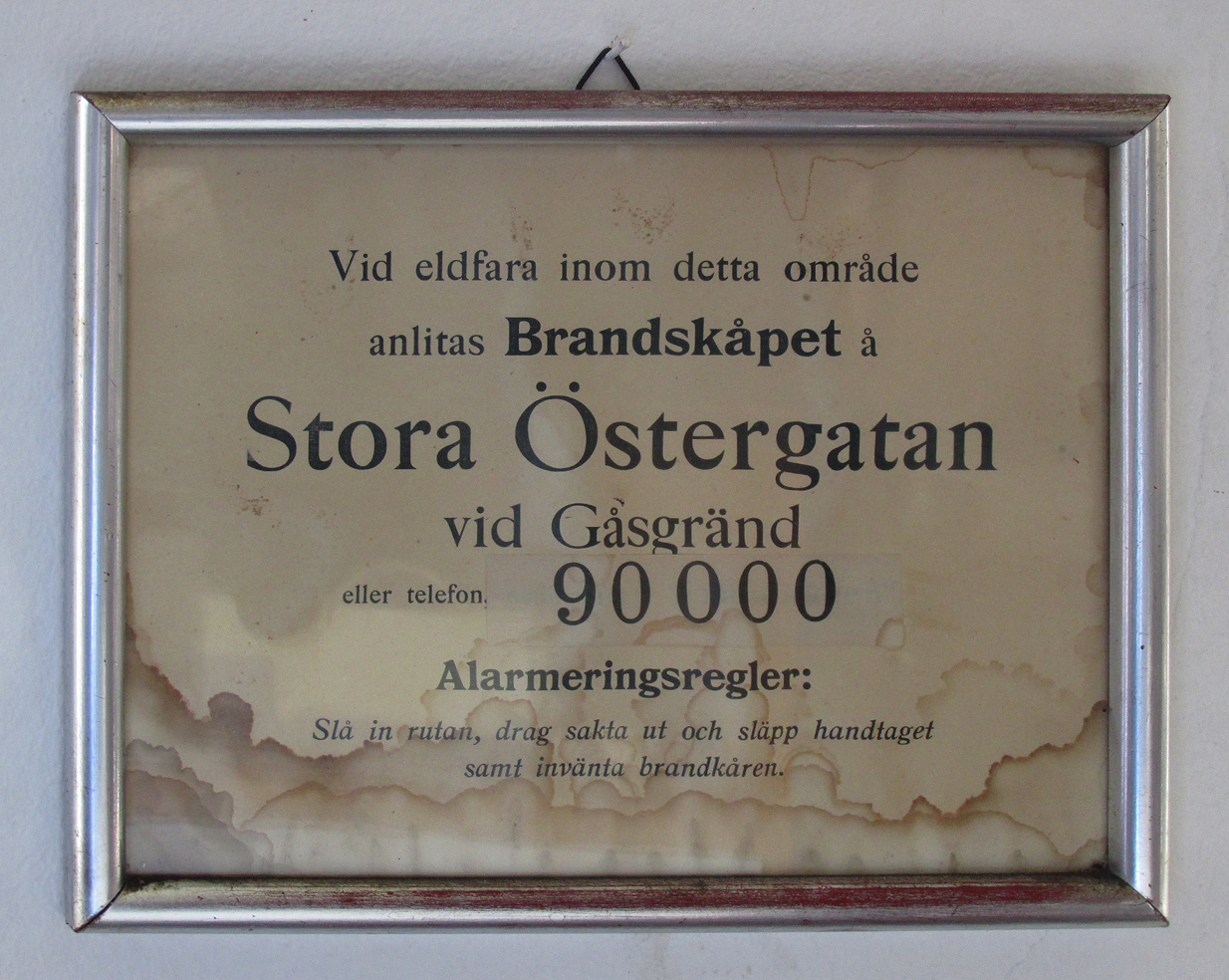
An old sign stating: "In case of fire in this area make use of Fire Cabinet at Stora Östergatan by Gåsgränd or telephone 90 000".

90 000 was the phone number to the Swedish emergency service that started in 1953, and was operational until 1 July 1996.

The number was chosen at a time when phones were large and had rotary dials, and it was specially adapted for Sweden. Unlike most other countries the Swedish rotary dish was labeled 0 to 9, instead of 1 to 0, and the phone number was considered to be easy to remember and easy to dial in darkness. The caller did not have to consider the number of zeros dialed as a connection would be established imminently after the first four.

==== Pulse dialing ====
Another reason the number 90 000 was chosen was because the relative ease you could call it without a dial dish through the pulse dialing system. The system worked as follow; you lift the phone handset, push the hookswitch in the pulse train sequence 10-paus-1-paus-1-paus-1-paus-1. When the sequence have been signalized the switchboard will execute the finalizing parts of the connection. For the new number 112 corresponding sequence will be 2-paus-2-paus-3.

An advantage with phone-number 90 000 was the low statistical plausibility that the number would be generated by mistake. The statistical probability for a loose connection, or other types of electrical fault, to achieve the number series 90 000 is very low compared to the number series 112. When the British telephone company BT Group introduced 112 to the United Kingdom the number of erroneous calls caused by electrical faults to be 8 million per year, which after technical measures was lowered to 200 000 per year. In relation British BT received about 25 million emergency calls in year 2001.

== Criticism ==
In 2011 criticism was directed towards SOS Alarm on the basis that the operator was considered to have misjudged callers emergency situations. In four cases had the persons in need had died as ambulances was sent too late or not at all. In one of these cases the operator was indicted for involuntary manslaughter, but was later freed in district court. In the judgment, however, the district court criticized that ambulance had not been sent on basis of the indications the patient had provided.

== Organisation ==
During a normal year SOS Alarm handles 3.8 million calls and 975,000 health matters. During 2017 about one-third of the 3 million incoming calls concurrence non-emergency matters and about 100,000 were prank calls.

== See also ==
- 112 (emergency telephone number)
- 113 13 (telephone number)
- 114 14 (telephone number)
- Vårdguiden 1177
- 9-1-1
- Emergency telephone number
