= Ina Bäckström =

Swedish television presenter

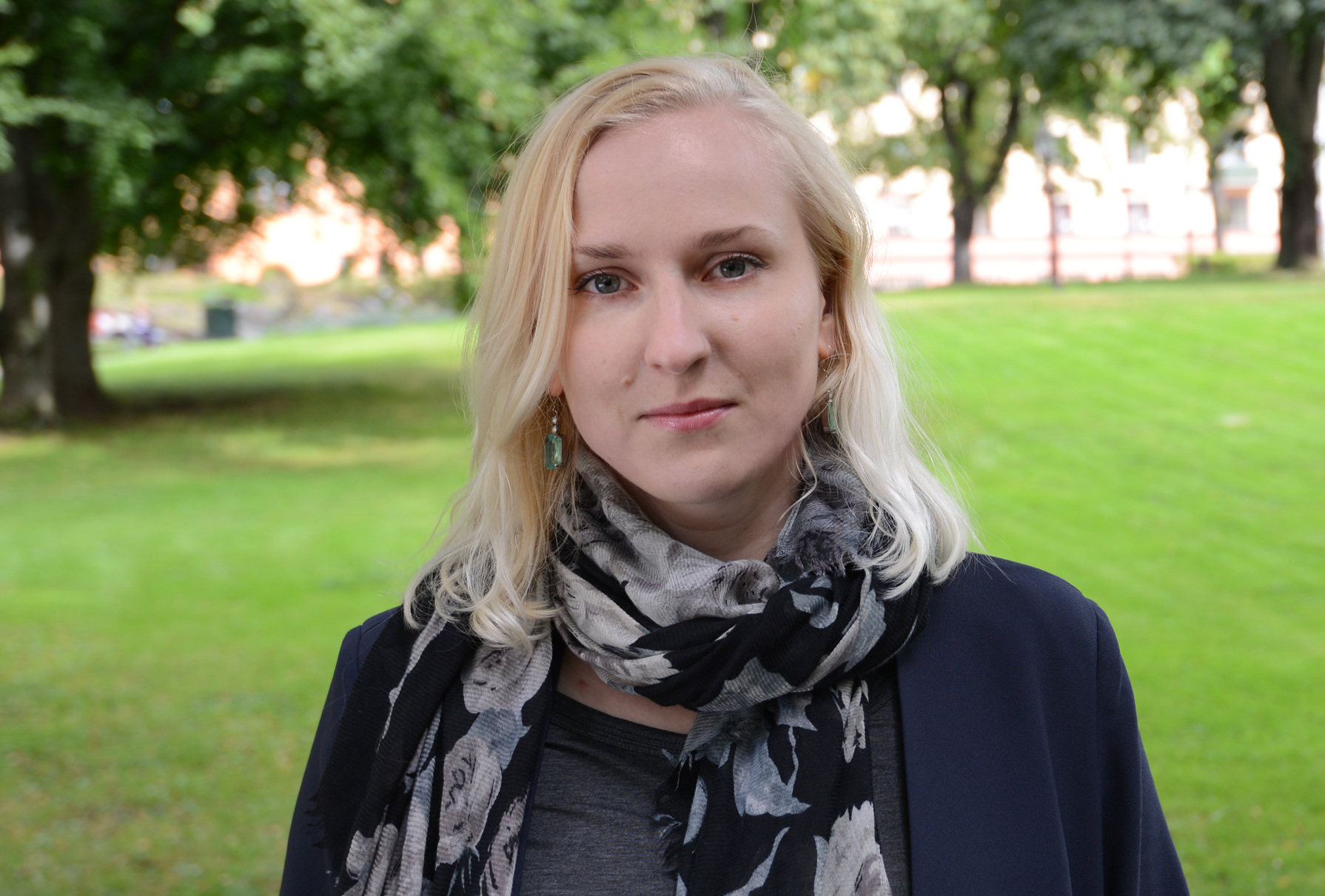
- Born: 27 March 1987 (age 39); Stockholm, Sweden
- Occupations: E-Sports reporter Game developer
- Awards: 2012 Microsoft "IT Girl of the Year"

Ina Bäckström is a Swedish video game developer and the program leader and founder of Barcraft, Sweden's first e-sports' pub. Bäckström was born on March 27, 1987, in Stockholm, Sweden.

She was named the IT Girl of the Year by Microsoft in 2012.

== Education ==
In 2009, Bäckström attended the Uppsala University in Gotland, Sweden for the introduction to game design and analysis.

Bäckström attended Stockholm University from 2010 to 2011 to represent design students at the university. In 2011, she attended the FutureGames Academy for two years to study game design.

== Career ==
In 2010, Bäckström became an E-Sports reporter for Sveriges Television (SVT). A year later in 2011, she founded BarCraft STHLM.

Bäckström was the program leader for SVT's E-sports broadcast at Dreamhack Summer 2012 and Dreamhack Winter 2012. She was the program manager at Dreamhack Summer 2013.

In 2014, Bäckström worked for Paradox Interactive as a game developer and associate producer. She is credited with being on the development teams for Cities: Skylines, Warlock II: The Exiled, and Crusader Kings II: Sons of Abraham.

In 2015, Bäckström worked for Wikimedia Sverige as its first Communications Strategist.

Bäckström left her job at SVT in 2016 to focus on developing video games at Avanade.

== Frizon Gaming Guild ==
In July 2011, Ina Bäckström and Monika Nilimaa founded the Frizon Gaming Guild, an organization designed to help get girls interested in gaming and game design. The guild hosts workshops, lectures, and meetings to assist new developers with their own projects.
