= Veckans brott =

Swedish crime television show

Veckans brott is a Swedish crime television show on SVT which has been airing since 2010. From 2010-2018 it was hosted by Camilla Kvartoft with expert commentary by criminology professor Leif G. W. Persson.

In 2019 the show was reinstated, however with Camilla Kvartoft as the lone presenter. Persson's former role has been superseded by bringing in various guests into the show who have relevant criminology experience.

The show brings up different crime cases each week such as cold cases, robberies, and current murders and also covers police work.
