= Efterlyst =

- Genre: Reality television
- Presented by: Brynolf Wendt (1990–1991); Hasse Aro (1991–2014, 2018–present); Robert Aschberg (2014); Jenny Gourman Strid (2014); Katarina Wennstam (2015); Hasse Brontén (2015); Tage Åström (2015)
- Country of origin: Sweden
- Original language: Swedish

Production
- Producer: Strix Television
- Production location: Stockholm

Original release
- Network: TV3 (1990–2015, 2018–present); TV8 (2015–2016)
- Release: 1990

Efterlyst ("Wanted") is a Swedish television program, equivalent of America's Most Wanted. The show plays security camera footage, reconstructions of crimes, and then takes calls and tips from the Swedish public. Since it was first aired, Efterlyst has led to the identification and arrest of many of Sweden's most noted criminals. In Swedish prisons, Efterlyst is commonly referred to as "Golnytt", literally meaning "Snitch-news".

The host, Hasse Aro, was, until the season of 2009, assisted by crime-expert Leif G. W. Persson. From the 2010 season he is assisted by former State Police Chief Tommy Lindström. Since 2011 he is assisted by Jens Lapidus and Thomas Bodström. In the 2012 season only Thomas Bodström will assist as expert commentator.

On 5 February 2014, Aro made his last appearance as host of Efterlyst. Robert Aschberg and Jenny Gourman Strid will be the new hosts of the show.
