= Tomas von Brömssen =

Swedish actor (born 1943)

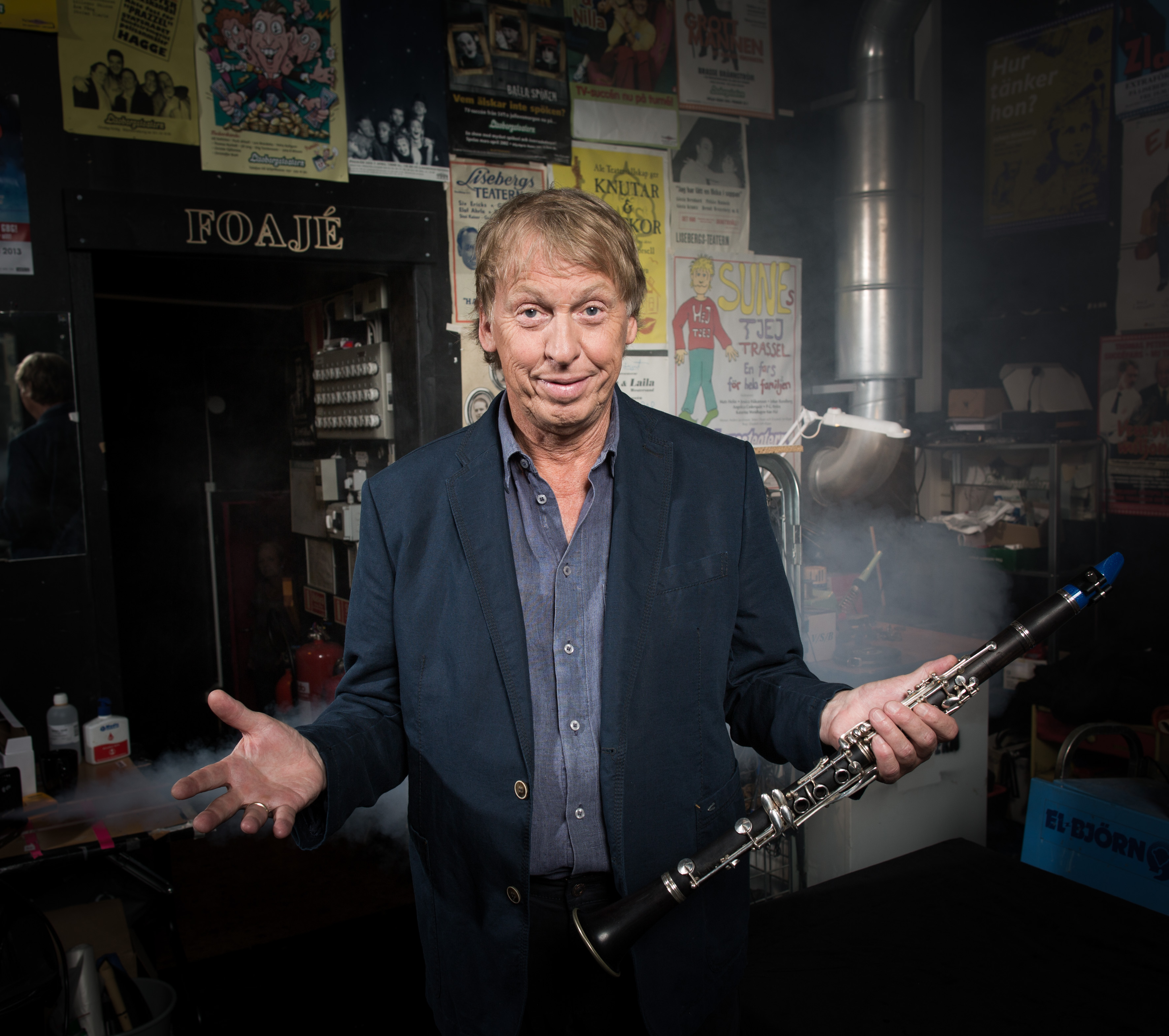
- von Brömssen in 2014
- Born: Tomas Birger von Brömssen; 8 May 1943 (age 83); Gothenburg, Sweden
- Education: Malmö Theatre Academy
- Occupation: Actor
- Years active: 1968–present
- Spouses: Eva Rask (m. 1966; died 2000) Dorthe Pedersen (m. 2004)

Tomas Birger von Brömssen (born 8 May 1943) is a Swedish theatre, film, and television actor.

== Early life ==
von Brömssen was born on 8 May 1943 in Örgryte, Gothenburg. His father, Birger von Brömssen, was a painter. He studied Scandinavian languages, intending to become a teacher, but decided to apply to Malmö Theatre Academy and was accepted. He graduated from the academy in 1969.

== Career ==
He played leading roles in Albert & Herbert, My Life as a Dog (Swedish: Mitt liv som hund), Dykaren (English title Baltic Sea, Salvation or The Diver), Mannen från Mallorca (English title The Man from Majorca) and Sofies verden (English title Sophie's World).

Together with Lars-Eric Brossner, he wrote the 2003 play The Story of the Little Gentleman, based on Barbro Lindgren's book The Story of the Little Old Man.

He appeared in Mending Hugo's Heart (2017). Although the film received negative review from critics, von Brömssen's performance was cited as a standout by Sofia Olsson in SVT Nyheter and Karolina Fjellborg in Aftonbladet.

== Personal life ==
He was first married to Eva von Brömssen from 1966 to 2000 (her death). He remarried on 21 November 2004 to the scientist Dorte Velling Pedersen, close friend to his first wife Eva.

== Awards ==
In 1992, von Brömssen received Povel Ramel's prize Karamelodiktstipendiet. In 1995, he won the Guldbagge Award in the category best male actor in a supporting role, for his role in All Things Fair. He was nominated for the same award in 2019.

He received the royal medal Litteris et Artibus in 2014.
