= Backstrom (American TV series) =

2015 American crime comedy-drama

- Genre: Crime drama; Comedy drama
- Based on: The Bäckström Series by Leif G. W. Persson
- Developed by: Hart Hanson
- Starring: Rainn Wilson; Genevieve Angelson; Kristoffer Polaha; Page Kennedy; Beatrice Rosen; Thomas Dekker; Dennis Haysbert
- Country of origin: United States
- Original language: English
- No. of seasons: 1
- No. of episodes: 13

Production
- Executive producers: Hart Hanson; Leif G.W. Persson; Mark Mylod; Niclas Salomonsson
- Producer: Rainn Wilson
- Running time: 43 minutes
- Production companies: Far Field Productions; 20th Century Fox Television

Original release
- Network: Fox
- Release: January 22 – April 30, 2015

Backstrom is an American crime comedy-drama television series that aired from January 22 through April 30, 2015. It was developed by Hart Hanson based on the Swedish book series by Leif G. W. Persson. The series is set in Portland, Oregon and filmed in Vancouver, British Columbia. On May 8, 2015, Fox cancelled the series after one season.

== Premise ==
Backstrom centers on Everett Backstrom (Rainn Wilson), an "overweight, offensive, irascible" police officer who is engaged in a constant struggle with his "self-destructive" tendencies, and is part of a team of eccentric criminologists.

== Cast and characters ==
=== Main cast ===
- Rainn Wilson as Detective Lieutenant Everett Backstrom, head of the Special Crimes Unit. Prior to the beginning of the series Backstrom was demoted to Traffic following his racially insensitive outburst after he caught the murderer of six Native Americans.
- Genevieve Angelson as Detective Sergeant Nicole Gravely, Backstrom's second in command. Gravely is a young, idealistic detective who works with Backstrom even though she finds him to be lazy and cynical. Originally played by Mamie Gummer in the CBS pilot.
- Page Kennedy as Officer Frank Moto, member of the Special Crimes Unit, and a former MMA fighter.
- Kristoffer Polaha as Sergeant Peter Niedermayer, the unit's Forensics Liaison. Backstrom frequently mocks him for his New Age beliefs.
- Dennis Haysbert as Detective Sergeant John Almond, a nondenominational minister who has been married for 30 years. In an offhand remark, Gravely mentions to Backstrom that Almond has the highest conviction rate out of any detective in the history of the Portland Police Bureau.
- Beatrice Rosen as Nadia Paquet, a foreign-born civilian who supports the detectives in the Special Crimes Group as a cyberspace expert.
- Thomas Dekker as Gregory Valentine, a former male prostitute who is Backstrom's tenant, decorator and "underworld connection" due to his being a fence for stolen merchandise. Backstrom had previously met Valentine's mother, a prostitute. It is later revealed that Valentine is Backstrom's half-brother.

=== Recurring ===
- Ben Hollingsworth as ADA Steve Kines, who previously allowed Gravely to be blamed for a failed undercover operation
- Sarah Chalke as Amy Gazanian, Chair of the Civilian Oversight Committee and Backstrom's ex-fiancée
- Inga Cadranel as Police Chief Anna Cervantes, Backstrom's former (police) partner
- Rizwan Manji as Doctor Deb, a doctor working for the Portland Police Bureau who provisionally clears Backstrom for duty with the caveat that he change his self-destructive lifestyle
- Robert Forster as Sheriff Blue Backstrom, Everett Backstrom's estranged father, who pistol-whipped Everett at a young age. He is Sheriff of Cooch County
- Adam Beach as Tribal Police Captain Jesse Rocha, one of Backstrom's rivals who begins dating Amy Gazanian

== Episodes ==
No.	Title	Directed by	Written by	Original release date	Prod. code	US viewers (millions)
1	"Dragon Slayer"	Mark Mylod	Hart Hanson	January 22, 2015	1AWM79	7.98
The Special Crimes Unit (SCU) investigate the staged-suicide of a senator's son on a college campus. After scoffing at health risks, Backstrom shoots himself during a raid on a heroin-dealer's club.
2	"Bella"	Alex Chapple	Joe Hortua	January 29, 2015	1AWM04	5.32
While the SCU pursue a serial arsonist, Backstrom investigates thefts from the scenes of the fires, targeting corrupt firefighters who were his childhood bullies.
3	"Takes One to Know One"	Randy Zisk	Hart Hanson	February 5, 2015	1AWM01	3.64
The SCU work a high-profile murder at the cultish Church of Edification. Backstrom's ex-fiancée, new head of the civilian oversight committee, begins looking into the shooting; Backstrom tells his doctor the truth of it to get sleeping pills.
4	"I Am a Bird Now"	David Boyd	Karyn Usher	February 12, 2015	1AWM02	4.39
The SCU investigate the murder of a cross-dresser; Valentine is one of the suspects. Backstrom is called to testify to the Civilian Oversight Committee, and Moto considers perjuring himself to corroborate Backstrom's story.
5	"Bogeyman"	Jeff Woolnough	Eli Attie & Hart Hanson	February 19, 2015	1AWM07	3.54
The SCU race to find a missing girl, Backstrom suspecting a predator from seven years earlier. Valentine offers insight from his own abduction. Almond's church faces eviction.
6	"Ancient, Chinese, Secret"	Sarah Pia Anderson	Thomas Wong	February 26, 2015	1AWM10	3.81
The SCU pursue the killer of a Chinatown fortune-teller who was involved in a gambling den. Niedermayer grows closer to Paquet, who is in a witness protection program.
7	"Enemy of My Enemies"	Jace Alexander	Andrew Miller	March 5, 2015	1AWM03	3.90
The SCU hunt for an activist linked to a deadly pipeline bombing. Sheriff Blue Backstrom is also working the case, and Backstrom is determined to beat him to the arrest.
8	"Give 'Til It Hurts"	Rob Hardy	Karine Rosenthal	March 26, 2015	1AWM06	3.58
While investigating the murder of a wealthy woman, the SCU go undercover at a black-tie charity gala. Backstrom's ex tries to inspire him with a 30-day AA chip, which he uses to fool Dr Deb.
9	"The Inescapable Truth"	Michael Offer	Eli Attie	April 2, 2015	1AWM05	3.16
The SCU investigate the death of a drug-addict musician by one of his bandmates. He was a material witness for Kines, who previously let Gravely take the blame for a failed undercover operation. Backstrom feels a familial connection to Valentine.
10	"Love Is a Rose and You Better Not Pick It"	Kevin Hooks	Joe Hortua	April 9, 2015	1AWM08	3.29
The SCU investigate the murder of a sex surrogate in a city rose garden. Backstrom is confronted with his own intimacy issues, and the circumstances of his mother's death.
11	"I Like to Watch"	Adam Arkin	Karine Rosenthal	April 16, 2015	1AWM09	3.39
A transgressive artist is killed, having planned to fake his death in a performance. Backstrom connects with another artist who is living in a bubble.
12	"Corkscrewed"	Jeffrey Walker	Andrew Miller	April 23, 2015	1AWM12	3.00
A criminal is killed outside the barge, throwing suspicion on both Backstrom and Valentine. The SCU investigate a wine-smuggling operation which takes them from river rats to the Governors Club. Backstrom learns his ex is dating his rival.
13	"Rock Bottom"	Kevin Hooks	Hart Hanson	April 30, 2015	1AWM11	2.80
Backstrom works with Captain Rocha (Adam Beach) in pursuit of a murderous meth dealer, to get his father on corruption charges, and save his career in light of Dr Deb's medical report. Coming to certain resolutions, the series concludes with Backstrom attending a 12-step program.

== Production ==
In July 2012, CBS greenlit a pilot episode to be produced for Backstrom. The pilot for the series was filmed in Vancouver, British Columbia, Canada.

When CBS passed on the pilot, 20th Century Fox Television shopped it around to other networks before landing a 13-episode series order with their own network, Fox. For the pilot episode, the producers contacted Minor League Baseball team Portland Sea Dogs to use their hat with their logo for the family fishing boat business.

== Reception ==
Backstrom has been met with mixed reviews from critics. On Rotten Tomatoes, the show holds a rating of 37%, based on 41 reviews, with an average rating of 4.78/10. The site's critical consensus reads, "Backstrom's humor is a cop-out, availed little by the talented cast's attempt to make good of sloppy schtick." On Metacritic, the show has a score of 51 out of 100, based on 31 critics, indicating "Mixed or average reviews".

== Other adaptations ==
A Swedish-language version was created in 2020 and currently (2024) has 3 seasons.
