= Camilla Kvartoft =

Swedish television presenter

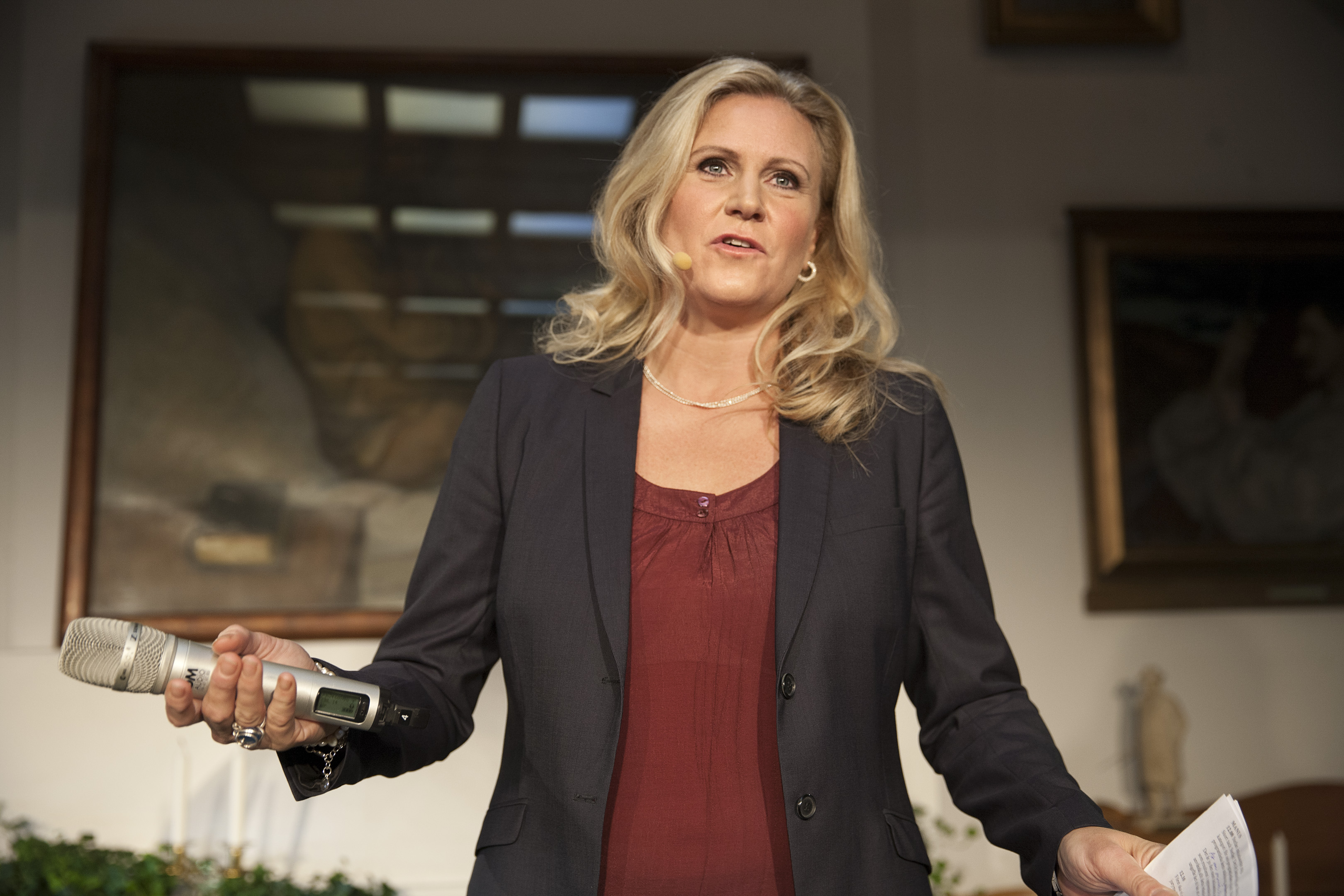
- Camilla Kvartoft in October 2013
- Born: Hägersten, Sweden; 6 March 1968 (age 57)
- Occupations: television presenter, journalist
- Years active: 1995–present
- Spouse: Anders Mårten
- Children: 2

Camilla Kvartoft (born 6 March 1968) is a Swedish television presenter and journalist. She hosted the SVT crime show Veckans Brott between 2010–2018. Kvartoft was born in Hägersten, Sweden. Kvartoft has also presented the political debates between the party leaders on SVT.
