= Salix daltoniana =

Scientific classification
- Kingdom: Plantae
- Clade: Tracheophytes
- Clade: Angiosperms
- Clade: Eudicots
- Clade: Rosids
- Order: Malpighiales
- Family: Salicaceae
- Genus: Salix
- Species: S. daltoniana

Binomial name
- Salix daltoniana Andersson

Shrub in the genus of willows

Salix daltoniana is a shrub or small tree from the genus of the willow ( Salix ) with mostly 4.5 to 9 centimeters long leaf blades . The natural range of the species is in India, Nepal, Bhutan, and in Tibet.

== Description ==
Salix daltoniana grows as a shrub or small tree . The twigs are initially black-purple and sparsely hairy. The buds are egg-shaped, shorter than 1 centimeter and sometimes frosted. The leaveshave a petiole about 1 centimeter long. The leaf blade is lanceolate, oblong or elliptical, 4.5 to 9 inches long and 1.5 to 2.5 inches wide. The leaf margin is serrate or seldom indistinctly glandular, the leaf base is wedge-shaped to rounded, the leaf end pointed. The upper side of the leaf is dull green, initially sparsely hairy and later glabrous or hairy only along the leaf veins. The underside is densely hairy, lead-gray, silky and shiny. The central vein is clearly formed on the upper side of the leaf, the veins are inconspicuous on the underside. Usually 11 to 14, rarely up to 16 pairs of side veins are formed.

Male inflorescences are cylindrical, 3.5 to 6 centimeters long and 8 to 10 millimeters in diameter catkins . Two to five small leaves are formed on the peduncle. The bracts are yellowish-brown, spatulate-elongated, entire, notched or split and have a blunt or almost truncated end. Male flowers have 4 to 5.5 millimeters long, downy-haired stamens at the base. The anthers are yellow and elongated. Female catkins are 4 to 6, rarely up to 7 centimeters long and have a diameter of 5 to 6, with fruit ripening up to more than 10 millimeters. The bracts resemble those of the male catkins. Female flowers have an adaxial nectar gland that is about a third the length of the bracts . The ovary is egg-shaped and densely downy. The pen is about as long as the ovary and bilobed. The scar is purple and split. The fruits are ovoid-conical, finely hairy or bald, tapering, sitting or short-stalked capsules. Salix daltoniana blooms from May to June when the leaves shoot, the fruits ripen in July.

== Range ==
The natural range is in Bhutan, India (among others in Sikkim), Nepal, and in Tibet. In Tibet, they can be found in thickets and on mountain slopes at heights of 3000 to 4400 meters.

== Taxonomy ==
Salix daltoniana is a species from the genus of willows (Salix) in the willow family (Salicaceae). There, it is the section Psilostigmatae assigned. It was first scientifically described in 1859 by Nils Johan Andersson in the Journal of the Proceedings of the Linnean Society. No synonyms are known.

Salix daltoniana is similar to Salix balfouriana and Salix ernestii, but differs from them by the densely lead-gray, silky hairy and glossy underside of the leaves, the indistinctly developed leaf veins on the underside of the leaves and the non-twisted styluses and stigmas.
