= Communion of saints =

Spiritual union of Christians

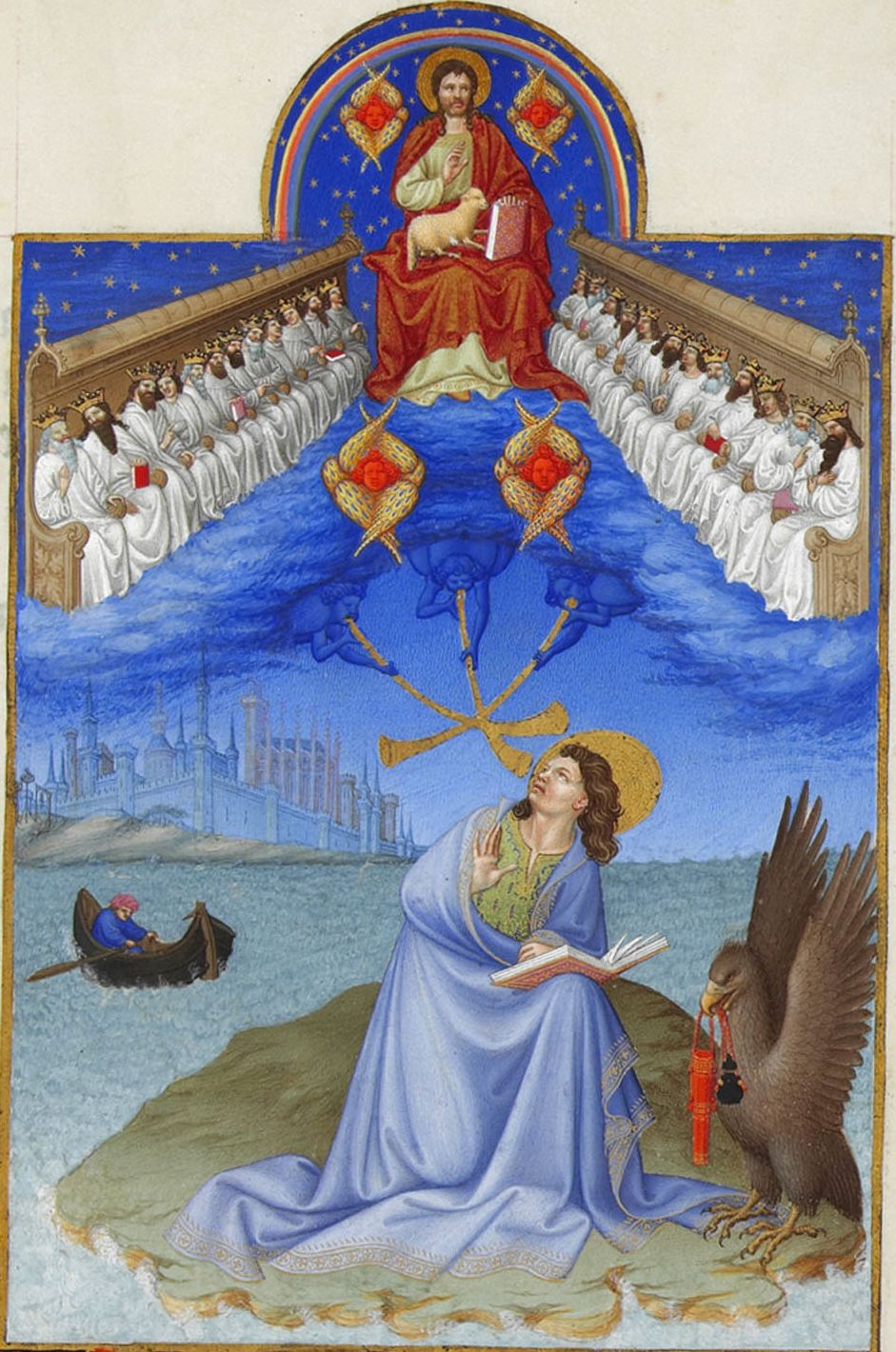
Revelation 5:8 presents the saints in Heaven as linked by prayer with their fellow Christians on earth

The communion of saints (Latin: commūniō sānctōrum, Ancient Greek: κοινωνίᾱ τῶν Ἁγῐ́ων, romanized: koinōníā tôn Hagíōn), when referred to persons, is the spiritual union of the members of the Christian Church, living and the dead, but excluding the damned. They are all part of a single "mystical body", with Christ as the head, in which each member contributes to the good of all and shares in the welfare of all.

The earliest known use of this term to refer to the belief in a mystical bond uniting both the living and the dead in a confirmed hope and love is by Saint Nicetas of Remesiana (c. 335–414); the term has since then played a central role in formulations of the Christian creed. Belief in the communion of saints is affirmed in the Apostles' Creed.

The word sanctorum in the phrase communio sanctorum can also be understood as referring not to holy persons, but to holy things, namely the blessings that the holy persons share with each other, including their faith, the sacraments and the other spiritual graces and gifts they have as Christians.

== History ==
The offering of the Holy Mass at Engelbrekt Church (Evangelical-Lutheran) in Lärkstaden on All Souls' Day; the painting above the high altar depicts the communion of saints.

The concept of the communion of saints is linked with Paul's teaching, as in Romans 12:4–13 and 1 Corinthians 12:12–27, that in Christ Christians form a single body.

The New Testament word ἅγιος (hagios, 'saint') can refer to Christians who, whatever their personal sanctity as individuals, are called holy because they are consecrated to God and Christ. This usage of the word saint is found some fifty times in the New Testament.

The Heidelberg Catechism, citing Romans 8:32, 1 Corinthians 6:17, and 1 John 1:3, asserts that all members of Christ have communion with him, and are recipients of all his gifts. Similarly, the Catechism of the Catholic Church states: "'Since all the faithful form one body, the good of each is communicated to the others.... We must therefore believe that there exists a communion of goods in the Church. But the most important member is Christ, since he is the head.... Therefore, the riches of Christ are communicated to all the members, through the sacraments.' 'As this Church is governed by one and the same Spirit, all the goods she has received necessarily become a common fund.'"

The persons who are linked in this communion include those who have died and whom Hebrews 12:1 pictures as a cloud of witnesses encompassing Christians on earth. In the same chapter, Hebrews 12:22–23 says Christians on earth "have come to Mount Zion, and to the city of the living God, the heavenly Jerusalem, and to innumerable angels in festal gathering, and to the assembly of the firstborn who are enrolled in Heaven, and to a judge who is God of all, and to the spirits of just men made perfect."

== Western Christianity ==
=== Catholicism ===
In Catholic terminology, the communion of saints exists in the three states of the Church, the Churches Militant, Penitent, and Triumphant. The Church Militant (Latin: Ecclesia militans) consisting of those alive on earth; the Church Penitent (Latin: Ecclesia poenitens) consisting of those undergoing purification in purgatory in preparation for Heaven; and the Church Triumphant (Latin: Ecclesia triumphans) consisting of those already in Heaven. The damned are not a part of the communion of saints. Catholics ask the intercession of saints in Heaven, whose prayers are seen as helping their fellow Christians on earth (cf. Revelation 5:8).

According to the Catechism of the Catholic Church:

946 What is the Church if not the assembly of all the saints? The communion of saints is the Church.
... 957 Communion with the saints. "It is not merely by the title of example that we cherish the memory of those in heaven; we seek, rather, that by this devotion to the exercise of fraternal charity the union of the whole Church in the Spirit may be strengthened. Exactly as Christian communion among our fellow pilgrims brings us closer to Christ, so our communion with the saints joins us to Christ, from whom as from its fountain and head issues all grace, and the life of the People of God itself"

=== Lutheranism ===
Martin Luther defined the phrase thus:

"The communion of saints." This is of one piece with the preceding ["the holy catholic church"]. Formerly it was not in the creed. When you hear the word "church," understand that it means group [Haufe], as we say in German, the Wittenberg group or congregation [Gemeine], that is, an holy, Christian group, assembly, or, in German, the holy, common church, and it is a word that should not be called "communion" [Gemeinschaft], but rather "a congregation" eine Gemeine. Someone wanted to explain the first term, "catholic church" [and added the words] communio sanctorum, which in German means a congregation of saints, that is, a congregation made up only of saints. "Christian church" and "congregation of saints" are one and the same thing.

Lutheranism affirms that the Church Militant (those alive on earth) and Church Triumphant (those alive in heaven) share a common goal and thus do pray for one another. The Augsburg Confession affirms that the saints "pray for the Church universal" in life and in heaven. The Apology of the Augsburg Confession teaches that the "blessed virgin Mary prays for the Church". In this way, Evangelical Lutheranism accepts a form of the doctrine of the intercession of the saints (while it rejects the invocation of the saints). The Book of Concord, the official compendium of Lutheran doctrine, teaches:

"... we know that the ancients speak of prayer for the dead, which we do not prohibit; but we disapprove of the application ex opere operato of the Lord's Supper on behalf of the dead." By the expression ex opere operato, it is meant the belief that the performance of the rite would of itself benefit the dead. The largest Lutheran denomination in the United States, the Evangelical Lutheran Church in America, "remembers the faithful departed in the Prayers of the People every Sunday, including those who have recently died and those commemorated on the church calendar of saints". In Funeral rites of the Evangelical Lutheran Church, "deceased are prayed for" using "commendations: 'keep our sister/brother ... in the company of all your saints. And at the last ... raise her/him up to share with all the faithful the endless joy and peace won through the glorious resurrection of Christ our Lord.'" The response for these prayers for the dead in this Lutheran liturgy is the prayer of Eternal Rest: "rest eternal grant him/her, O Lord; and let light perpetual shine upon him/her".

=== Reformed churches ===
The Westminster Confession, which articulates the Reformed faith, teaches that the communion of saints includes those united to Christ – both the living and the dead.

=== Anglican Communion ===
The Anglican Communion holds that baptized Christians "are 'knit together' with them 'in one communion and fellowship in the mystical body of [Christ]'." The Church of Ireland teaches that:

Christ's church includes the blessed dead along with those still on earth. We worship God 'with angels and archangels and with all the company of heaven' (Eucharistic Prayer, BCP 2004), with 'The glorious company of apostles ... the noble fellowship of prophets ... the white–robed army of martyrs' (Te Deum). In addition we observe saints' days when we thank God for their holy lives and pray that we may follow their examples.

In Anglican liturgy, "worship is addressed to God alone" and the Anglican Communion "does not pray to the saints but with the saints". However, Anglicans pray for the dead, "because we still hold them in our love, and because we trust that in God's presence those who have chosen to serve him will grow in his love, until they see him as he is."

=== Methodism ===
In Methodist theology, the communion of saints refers to the Church Militant and Church Triumphant. The Rev. Katie Shockley explains the communion of saints in the context of the Methodist sacrament of the Eucharist:

When we gather in worship, we praise God with believers we cannot see. When we celebrate Holy Communion, we feast with past, present and future disciples of Christ. We experience the communion of saints, the community of believers –– living and dead. This faith community stretches beyond space and time. We commune with Christians around the world, believers who came before us, and believers who will come after us. We believe that the church is the communion of saints, and as a believer, you belong to the communion of saints.

The communion of saints is celebrated in Methodism during Allhallowtide, especially on All Saints' Day.

Methodist theology affirms the "duty to observe, to pray for the Faithful Departed". John Wesley, the founder of Methodism, "taught the propriety of Praying for the Dead, practised it himself, provided Forms that others might." It affirms that the "saints in paradise" have full access to occurrences on earth.

== Eastern Christianity ==
=== Eastern Orthodoxy ===
==== Greek Orthodox Church ====
In Greek Orthodoxy, "the Church is also a communion of saints, an assembly of angels and men, of the Heaven and of the earth ... divided into what is known as the Church Militant and the Church Triumphant".

The Greek Orthodox Archdiocese of America teaches that "Through the work of the Holy Trinity all Christians could be called saints; especially in the early Church as long as they were baptized in the name of the Holy Trinity, they received the Seal of the Spirit in chrismation and frequently participated in the Eucharist."

Theologians classify six categories of saints within Eastern Orthodoxy:

1. The Apostles, who were the first ones to spread the message of the Incarnation of the Word of God and of salvation through Christ.
2. The Prophets, because they predicted and prophesied the coming of the Messiah.
3. The Martyrs, for sacrificing their lives and fearlessly confessing Jesus Christ as the Son of God and the Savior of mankind.
4. The Fathers and Hierarchs of the Church, who excelled in explaining and in defending, by word and deed, the Christian faith.
5. The Monastics, who lived in the desert and dedicated themselves to spiritual exercise (askesis), reaching, as far as possible, perfection in Christ.
6. The Just, those who lived in the world, leading exemplary lives as clergy or laity with their families, becoming examples for imitation in society.

=== Oriental Orthodoxy ===
==== Armenian Orthodox Church ====
The Armenian Orthodox Church understands the communion of saints to have a twofold sense: "first, of the union of members of the Church with the Head Christ; and, secondly, of the mutual help and support of these same members in obtaining enjoying, and preserving the common good things or graces of the Church."

== Comparison of views ==
Roman Catholic, Lutheran, Methodist and Orthodox churches practice praying for the dead (as they interpret 2 Timothy 1:16–18). Reformed churches do not pray for the dead. The Anglican tradition has been ambivalent about prayers for the dead historically, sometimes embracing and other times rejecting the practice.

With regard to the various views held about the communion of saints, the Catholic Encyclopedia of 1907 wrote:

Sporadic errors against special points of the communion of saints are pointed out by the Synod of Gangra (Mansi, II, 1103), St. Cyril of Jerusalem (P.G., XXXIII, 1116), St. Epiphanius (ibid., XLII, 504), Asteritis Amasensis (ibid., XL, 332), and St. Jerome (P.L., XXIII, 362). From the forty-second proposition condemned, and the twenty-ninth question asked, by Martin V at Constance (Denzinger, nos. 518 and 573), we also know that Wyclif and Hus had gone far towards denying the dogma itself.

But the communion of saints became a direct issue only at the time of the Reformation. The Lutheran churches, although commonly adopting the Apostles' Creed, still in their original confessions, either pass over in silence the communion of saints or explain it as the Church's "union with Jesus Christ in the one true faith" (Luther's Small Catechism), or as "the congregation of saints and true believers" (Augsburg Confession, ibid., III, 12), carefully excluding, if not the memory, at least the invocation of the saints, because Scripture "propoundeth unto us one Christ, the Mediator, Propitiatory, High-Priest, and Intercessor" (ibid., III, 26).

The Reformed churches generally maintain the Lutheran identification of the communion of saints with the body of believers but do not limit its meaning to that body. Calvin (Inst. chret., IV, 1, 3) insists that the phrase of the Creed is more than a definition of the Church; it conveys the meaning of such a fellowship that whatever benefits God bestows upon the believers should mutually communicate to one another. That view is followed in the Heidelberg Catechism, emphasized in the Gallican Confession, wherein communion is made to mean the efforts of believers to mutually strengthen themselves in the fear of God. Both the Scotch and Second Helvetic Confessions bring together the Militant and the Triumphant Church, but whereas the former is silent on the signification of the fact, the latter says that they hold communion with each other: "nihilominus habent illae inter sese communionem, vel conjunctionem".

The double and often conflicting influence of Luther and Calvin, with a lingering memory of Catholic orthodoxy, is felt in the Anglican Confessions. On this point the Thirty-nine Articles are decidedly Lutheran, rejecting as they do "the Romish Doctrine concerning Purgatory, Pardons, Worshipping and Adoration as well of Images as of Relics, and also Invocation of Saints", because they see in it "a fond thing, vainly invented, and grounded upon no warranty of Scripture, but rather repugnant to the Word of God".

On the other hand, the Westminster Confession, while ignoring the Suffering and the Triumphant Church, goes beyond the Calvinistic view and falls little short of the Catholic doctrine with regard to the faithful on earth, who, it says, "being united to one another in love, have communion in each other's gifts and graces".

In the United States, the Methodist Articles of Religion, 1784, as well as the Reformed Episcopal Articles of Religion, 1875, follow the teachings of the Thirty-nine Articles, whereas the teaching of the Westminster Confession is adopted in the Philadelphia Baptist Confession, 1688, and in the Confession of the Cumberland Presbyterian Church, 1829. Protestant theologians, just as Protestant confessions, waver between the Lutheran and the Calvinistic view.

== See also ==
- Incorruptibility
- Church invisible
- "When the Saints Go Marching In"
