= Cyperus mutisii =

Scientific classification
- Kingdom: Plantae
- Clade: Tracheophytes
- Clade: Angiosperms
- Clade: Monocots
- Clade: Commelinids
- Order: Poales
- Family: Cyperaceae
- Genus: Cyperus
- Species: C. mutisii

Binomial name
- Cyperus mutisii (Kunth) Andersson, 1854

Species of sedge

Cyperus mutisii is a species of sedge that is native to parts of southern parts of North America, throughout Central America and in northern parts of South America.

== See also ==
- List of Cyperus species
