= J. A. G. Acke =

Swedish painter, illustrator and sculptor (1859–1924)

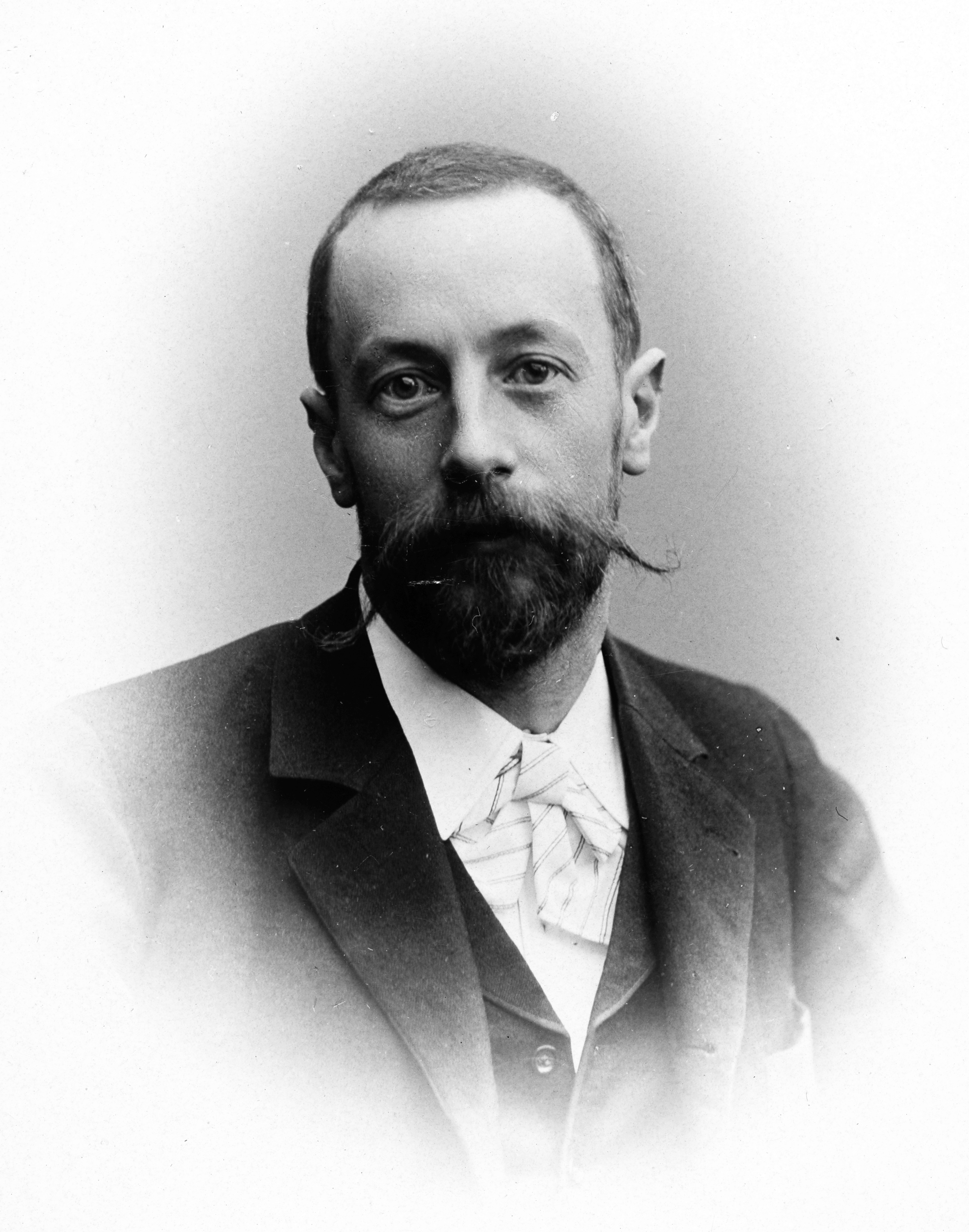
- Born: 7 April 1859; Bergielund in Stockholm
- Died: 5 September 1924 (aged 65); Vaxholm
- Known for: oil painting
- Movement: Önningeby artists' colony
- Spouse: Eva Topelius

Johan Axel Gustaf Acke (born Andersson; 7 April 1859 – 5 September 1924), was a Swedish painter, illustrator and sculptor. He was also an amateur architect and designed two villas for himself. One of the first members of the Önningeby artists' colony in Finland.

== Biography ==
Born in Bergielund, Stockholm, Johan Axel Gustaf Andersson was the son of the botanist and professor Nils Johan Andersson and the artist Anna Tigerhielm. His brother was the artist and naval commander, Nils Elias Anckers. His sisters were also artistically active, including the botanist Sigrid Rissler. He grew up in Bergielund, located near Vasa Park. His father served as a curator at the Swedish Museum of Natural History and had his official residence there. As a child, he accompanied his father on his research trips to Lapland and Gotland and created illustrations for his work.

He was only fourteen when he began taking basic courses at the Royal Swedish Academy of Fine Arts. He continued there until 1882, then took lessons at a private school operated by Edvard Perséus. He made study trips to the Netherlands, Belgium and France, where he studied etching. He disliked academic studies and joined with the rebellious young artists at the Royal Academy, but completed his studies there, nonetheless.

=== Önningeby colony and marriage ===
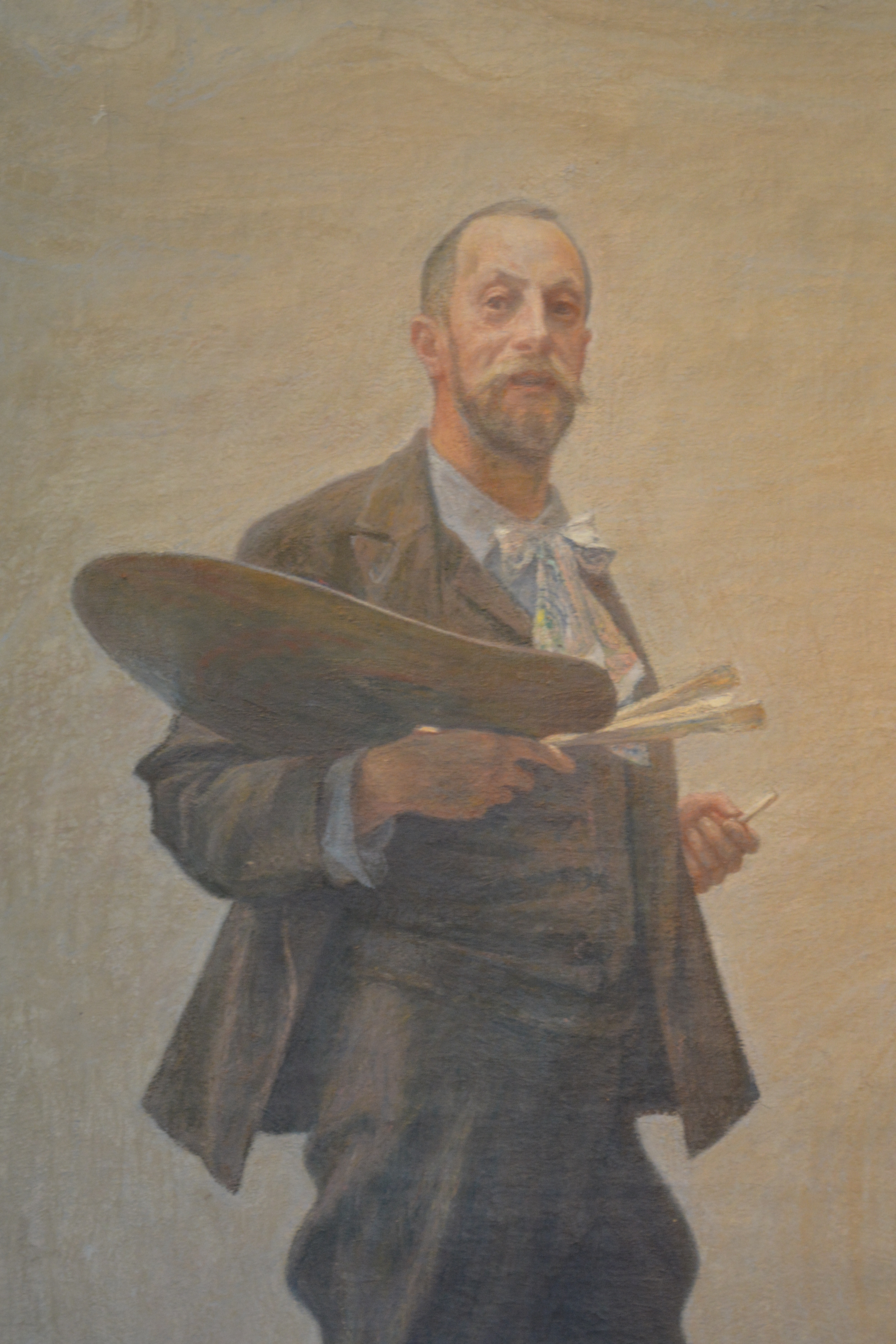
Self-Portrait (date unknown)

He went to Åland in 1886 and became a member of the Önningeby colony, a Swedish-Finnish artists' colony that existed from roughly 1886 to 1914. The founder was the Finnish painter Victor Westerholm, with whom he established close, life-long friendship. He painted prolifically there and engaged with the other artists, who saw him as an odd, energetic and humorous person. However, the artists all shared a disdain for the prevailing academic style and the Düsseldorf School, taking their inspiration from naturalism and Impressionism. Again, unlike the others, he would paint en plein aire in the winter. He visited the colony till 1892, and the years of his participating are considered the liveliest period in the colony's history.

In 1887, he met his future wife Eva Maria Topelius in Önningeby but, originally, they remained just friends. When his relationship with Anna Wengberg, another Swedish artist who painted in Önningeby, began to unravel, he married Topelius in 1891. Her father was the Finnish-Swedish writer Zachris Topelius.

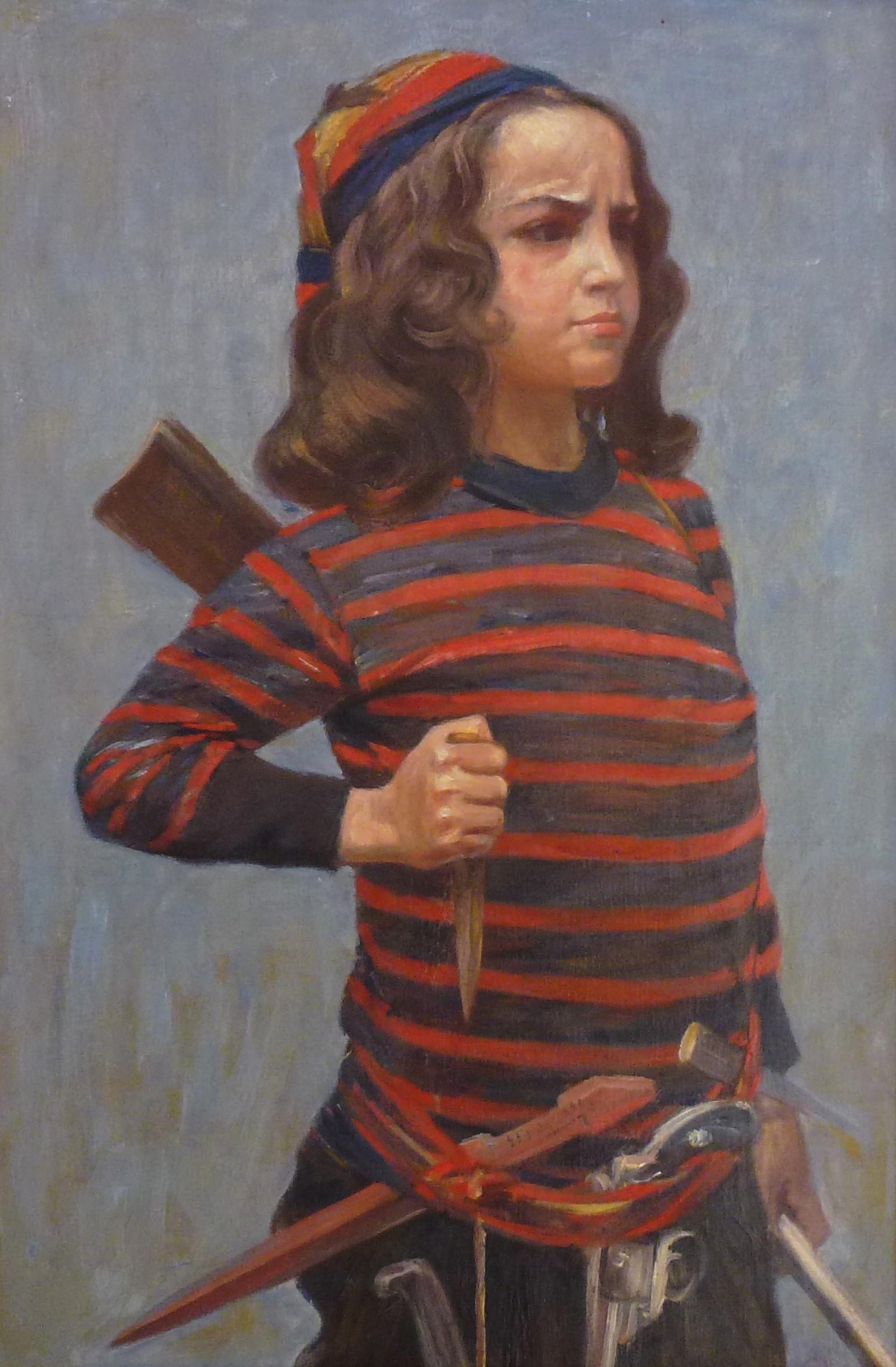
His adopted son, Fausto

=== Career in Sweden and Finland ===
In the 1890s, he participated in restoring the medieval wall paintings in Uppsala Cathedral. For several years, he worked on a large canvas, Snöljus (Snow light, 1892), which depicted winter fishing through the ice in Åland. He sent the painting to the Salon in Paris, but it was rejected. After that, he and Eva made fewer visits to Åland. At times, they lived in Finland and participated in the Finnish art scene. After her father's death in 1898, they came to be increasingly focused on the Swedish art community.

In 1901, the couple moved to Vaxholm, and built a home called the Villa Columbines. The marriage remained childless but, during a trip to Italy in 1900 to 1901, they met an Italian family, whose three-year-old son Fausto they adopted in 1903. In Sweden, they spent much of their time with their friends Carl Larsson and Rikard Lindström. Another acquaintance was the poet Verner von Heidenstam, whose portrait he painted. From 1902 to 1903, he and some Finnish artists made illustrations for his father-in-law's children's books. He had his name legally changed to Acke in 1904. In 1912, he made an extended trip to Rio de Janeiro, which influenced his paintings, especially his way of depicting light.

His last major work involved the frescoes at the Stockholm City Hall. He was working on a mural at the National History Museum, representing the philosophy of Emanuel Swedenborg, when he suddenly died, at home in the Villa Akleja in Vaxholm, of apparent heart failure.

== Selected paintings ==
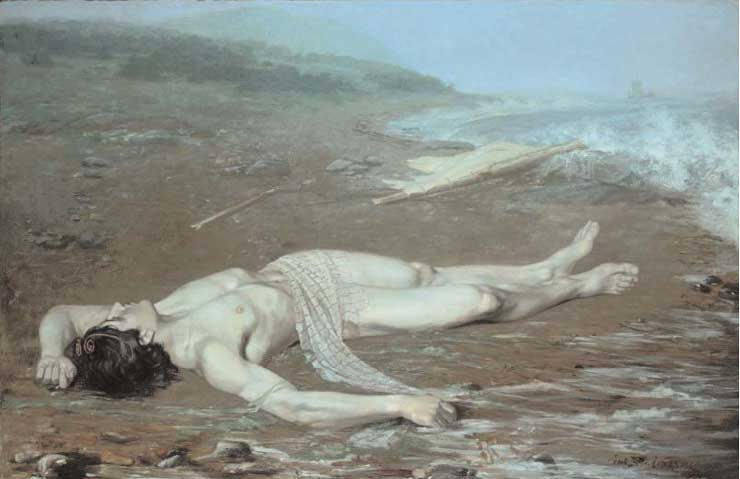
Leander's Body Washed Ashore

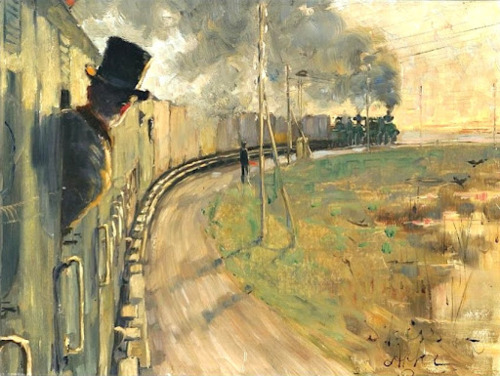
In the Train

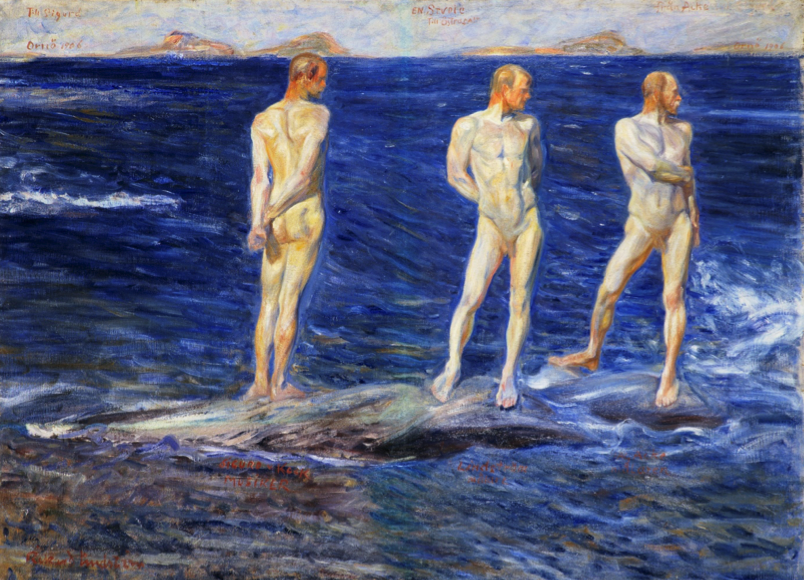
Östrasalt at the
Villa Akleja

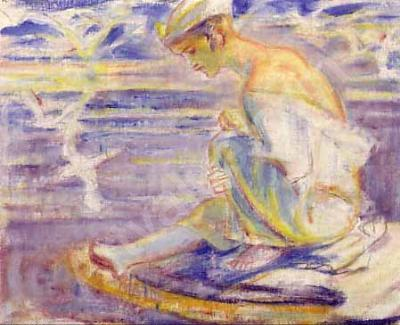
The Gull Girl

== Sources ==
- Konttinen, Riitta (1991) Konstnärspar Schildts, Helsingfors. Pgs. 111–126 ISBN 951-50-0543-4
- Kjell Ekström and Håkan Skogsjö (2003). Konst på Åland: en guide. Mariehamn: Skogsjömedia. pgs.30–37 ISBN 951-98576-7-2
- Nationalencyklopedin Vol.1 A-ASA, (1993). Bra böcker, Höganäs. ISBN 91-7024-619-X
