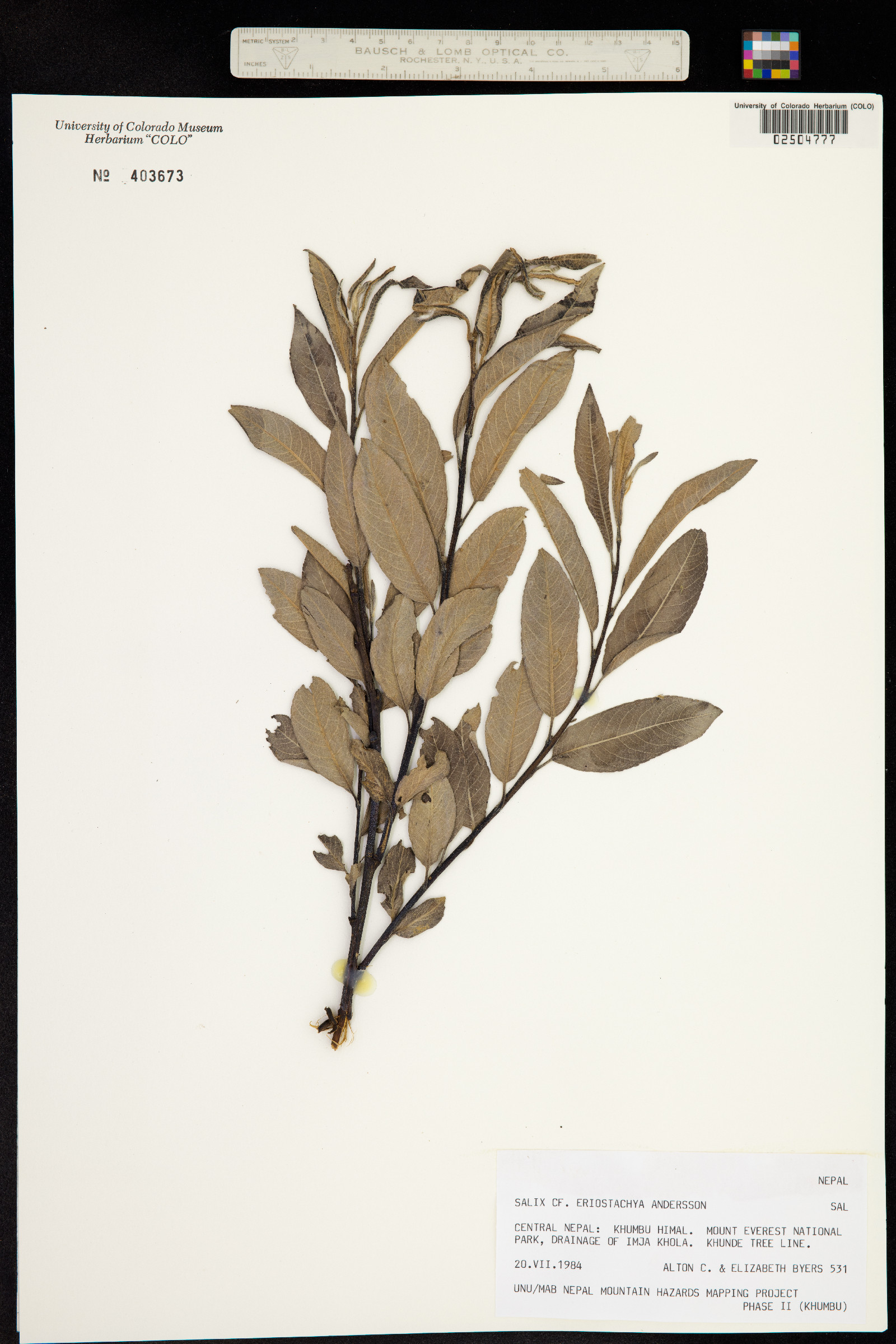

Scientific classification
- Kingdom: Plantae
- Clade: Tracheophytes
- Clade: Angiosperms
- Clade: Eudicots
- Clade: Rosids
- Order: Malpighiales
- Family: Salicaceae
- Genus: Salix
- Species: S. eriostachya

Binomial name
- Salix eriostachya Wall. ex Andersson

= Salix eriostachya =

Plant in the genus of willows

Salix eriostachya is a species from the genus of willows (Salix). It grows as a shrub with 4 to 11 centimeter leaf blades. The natural range of the species is in India, Nepal, and China.

== Description ==
Salix eriostachya grows as a shrub with black or dark brown, bare branches and buds that are finely hairy. The leaves have a petiole about 1.3 centimeters long and are hairy on top. The leaf blade is oblong, obovate, or lanceolate, 4 to 11 inches long and 1.5 to 3 inches wide. The leaf margin is dentate with entire or distant glands, with the base of the leaf wedge-shaped to broadly wedge-shaped, and the end of the leaf pointed to a short point. The upper side of the leaf is dark green, and the underside greenish. Both sides are initially downy or shaggy and later balding. The leaf veins protrude from the underside of the leaf. 15 to 20 lateral wire pairs are formed per leaf. The network-like veins are only vaguely pronounced. The stipules are ovate, about 1 millimeter long, glabrous, and toothed.

The inflorescences are about 3.5 centimeters long and 6 millimeters in diameter, catkins. The peduncle is about 2.5 inches long and has small leaves. The inflorescence axis is velvety. The bracts are obovate, 2 to 3 millimeters long, hairy, and downy. The leaf margin is whole or cut out. Male flowers have an egg-shaped, approximately 0.5 millimeter long adaxial and a very small abaxial nectar gland. There are two separate stamens formed with downy hairy stamens at the base. The anthers are yellow. The fruiting, female kittens are about 9 centimeters long with a diameter of about 1.5 centimeters. Female flowers usually have two nectar glands, although the abaxial one may be missing. The adaxial gland is broadly ovate and about 0.5 millimeters long. The ovary is sessile and hairy, white and shaggy. The stylus is 2 millimeters long and divided into two parts. The scar is linear and divided. The fruits are narrow, egg-shaped, about 6 millimeters long, and finely hairy capsules. Salix eriostachya blooms in June, and the fruits ripen from July to August.

== Range ==
The natural range is in India, Nepal, Tibet, in the Chinese provinces of Sichuan and Yunnan. There it grows in the mountains at heights of 3000 to 5000 meters.

== Taxonomy ==
Salix eriostachya is a species from the genus Salix in the willow family (Salicaceae). There, it is assigned to the section Psilostigmatae. In 1851, Nils Johan Andersson scientifically described them based on the description of an invalid by Nathaniel Wallich. Representatives of the species are attributed by some botanists to the species Salix ernestii.

The Flora of China indicates two varieties:

- Salix eriostachya var. Eriostachya: The ovary is sessile, the inflorescence stalk about 2.5 centimeters long and the bracts 2 to 3 millimeters long.
- Salix eriostachya var. Lineariloba (N. Chao) G. Zhu : The ovary has a short stalk, the catkins are almost sessile and the bracts are about 1.5 millimeters long.

According to The Plant List, a third variety is distinguished:

- Salix eriostachya var. Angustifolia (CF Fang) N. Chao
