= Nils Elias Anckers =

Swedish naval officer and marine artist (1858–1921)

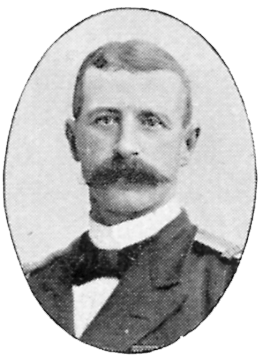
- Born: 7 June 1858; Stockholm, Sweden
- Died: 13 July 1921 (aged 63); Stockholm, Sweden
- Spouse: Maria Rundgren
- Relatives: Nils Johan Andersson (father); J. A. G. Acke (brother); Sigrid Rissler (sister)
- Military career
- Allegiance: Sweden
- Branch: Swedish Navy
- Rank: kommendör
- Commands: Mines division of the Royal Swedish Naval Materiel Administration; Stockholm naval yard
- Awards: Service Star (Congo)

Nils Elias Anckers, (until 1904 Andersson; 7 June 1858 – 13 July 1921) was a Swedish naval officer and marine artist. He served in the International Association of the Congo in the Congo Free State from 1884 to 1887 and had a successful military career after his return to Sweden. He obtained the rank of kommendör and became a member of the Royal Swedish Academy of War Sciences. In 1910 he served as the head of the naval yard in Stockholm. He studied etching at the Royal Swedish Academy of Fine Arts from 1895 to 1896, and won a silver medal for his art at the 1900 Paris Exposition.

== Early life ==
He was born on 7 June 1858, in Stockholm. His father was the botanist Nils Johan Andersson and his mother artist Anna Tigerhielm. His brother was the artist J. A. G. Acke and sister was the botanist Sigrid Rissler. In 1889, he married Maria Rundgren.

== Military career ==
Anckers pursued a career as an officer in the Swedish Navy; in 1878 he became underlöjtnant and he entered a special school for torpedo warfare in 1880. In 1882 he was promoted to löjtnant, and served on board several Swedish vessels.

In 1884 he entered into service of the International Association of the Congo, after having been recommended by his superiors. Upon his arrival in the Congo Free State, he was assigned surveillance duty of supply magazines in Léopoldville, present-day Kinshasa. In 1885 he requested and was granted a change of assignment and spent the year and most of 1886 ferrying goods in the interior of Congo; on one of his trips he accompanied German explorer and colonialist Hermann Wissmann to Luebo from Léopoldville. He took his leave and returned to Sweden in late 1887. For his services to the Congo Free State, he was awarded the Service Star.

After his return to Sweden, Anckers continued his naval career. In 1905 he was promoted to head of the mines division of the Royal Swedish Naval Materiel Administration, and in 1907 reached the rank of kommendör. In the same year, he was named a member of the Royal Swedish Academy of War Sciences. In 1910 he became head of the naval yard in Stockholm.

== Art career ==
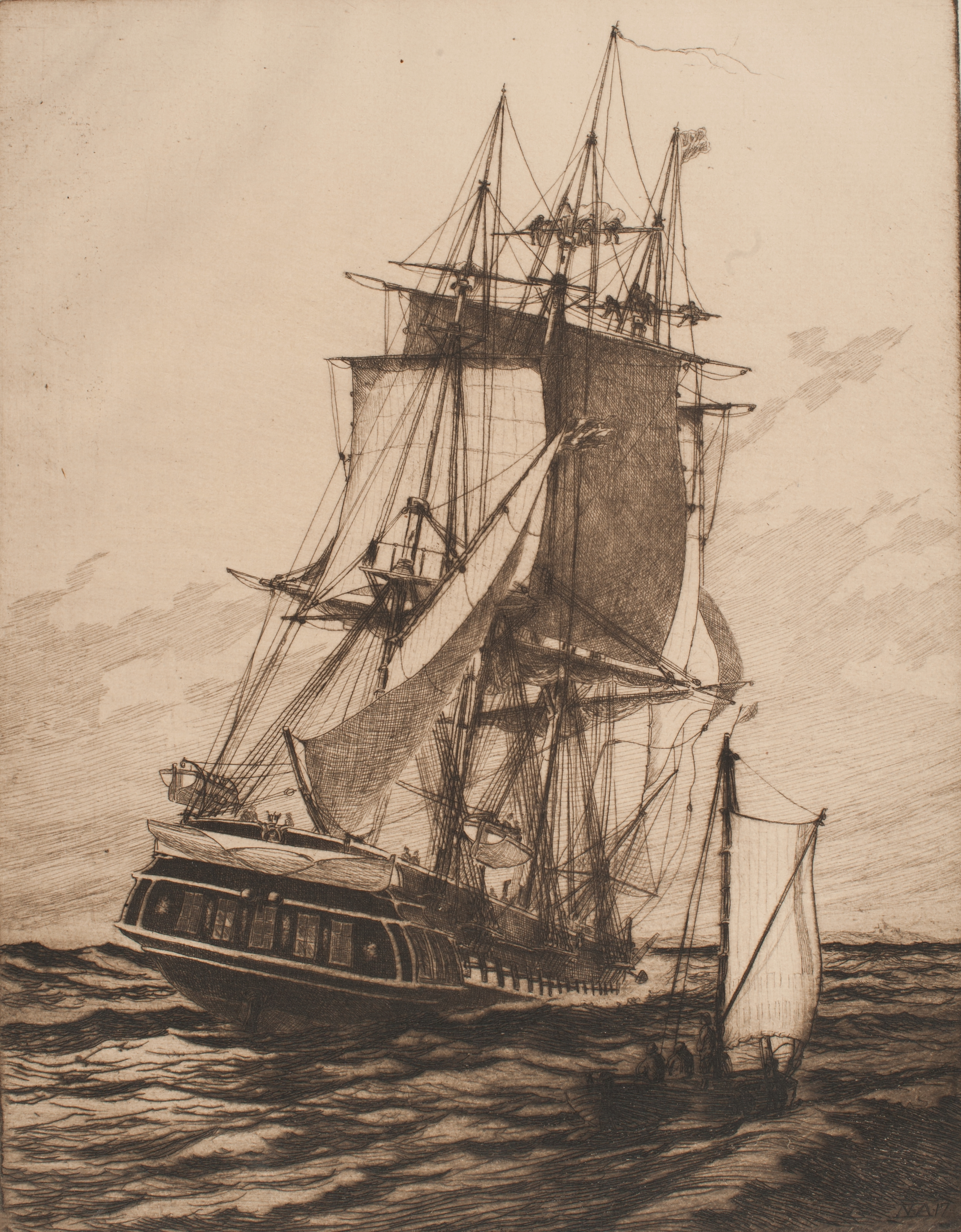
Swedish frigate Eugenie, etching by Anckers

Anckers was also active as an artist. He studied etching at the Royal Swedish Academy of Fine Arts from 1895 to 1896, and produced etchings on mainly marine subjects, often with considerable accuracy regarding the depiction of technical nautical details. At the 1900 Paris Exposition, he was awarded a silver medal.

Anckers died on 13 July 1921, in Stockholm.
