= Östermalm =

District Stockholm, Sweden

Coordinates: 59°20′15″N 18°05′20″E

- Stockholm district
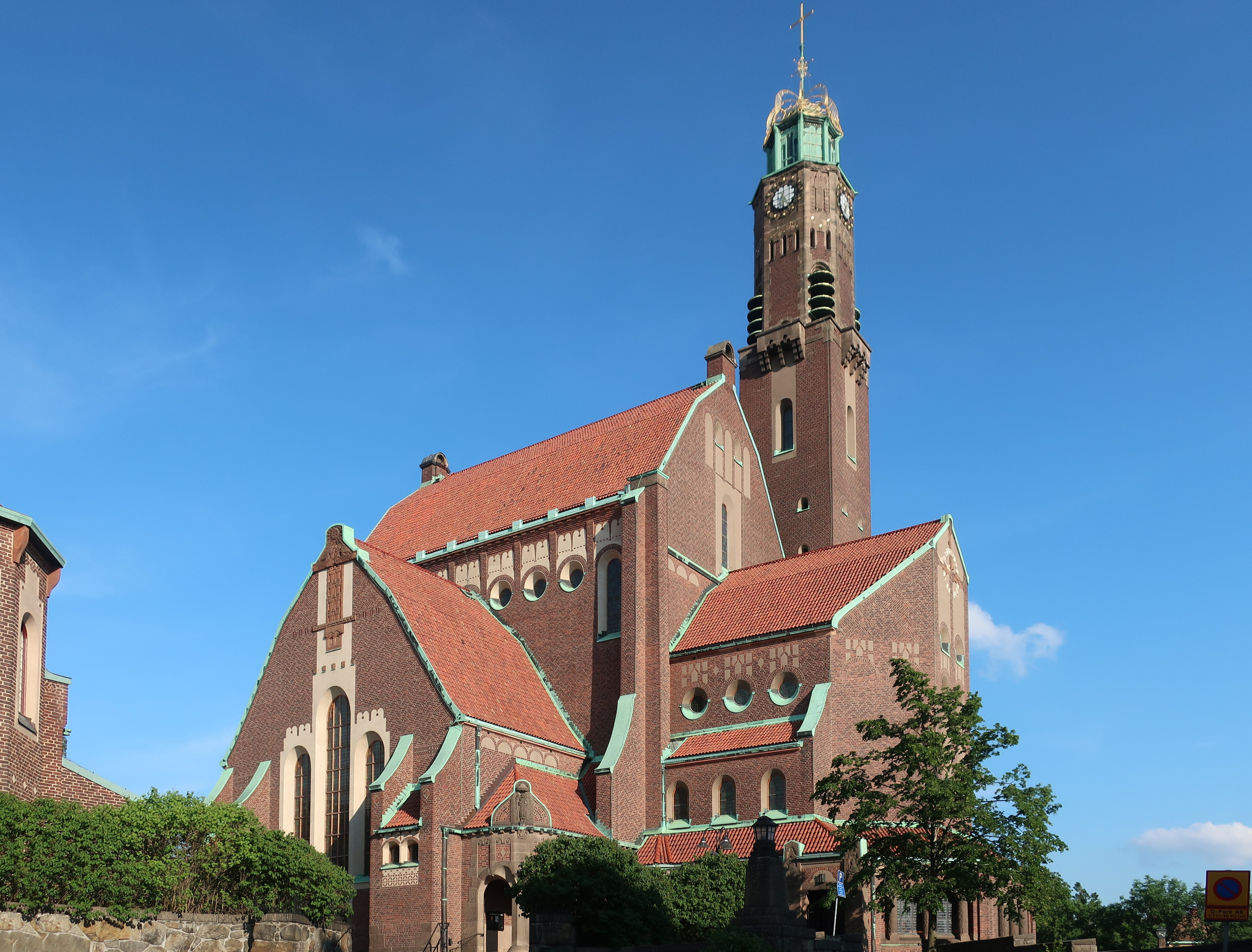
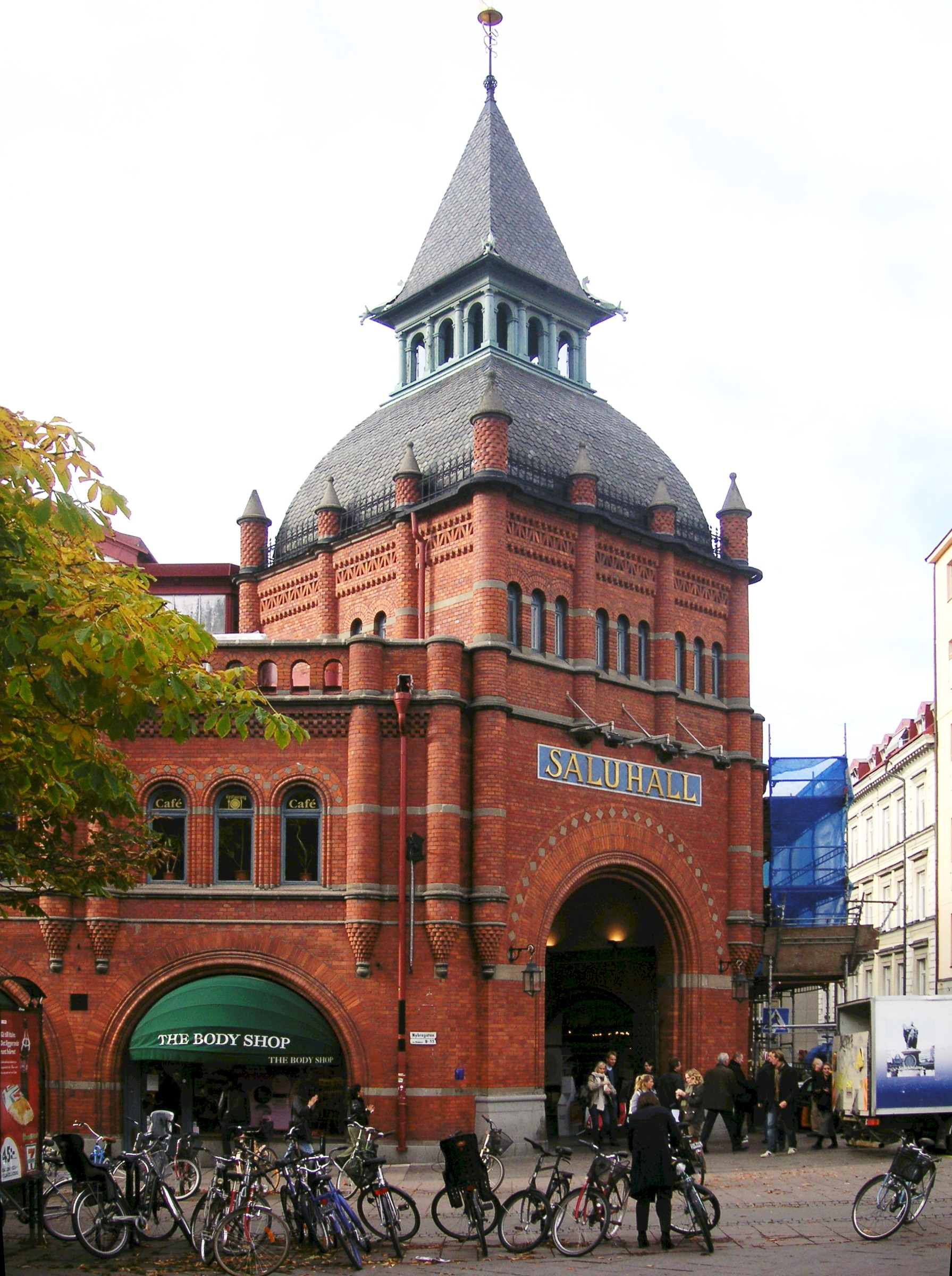
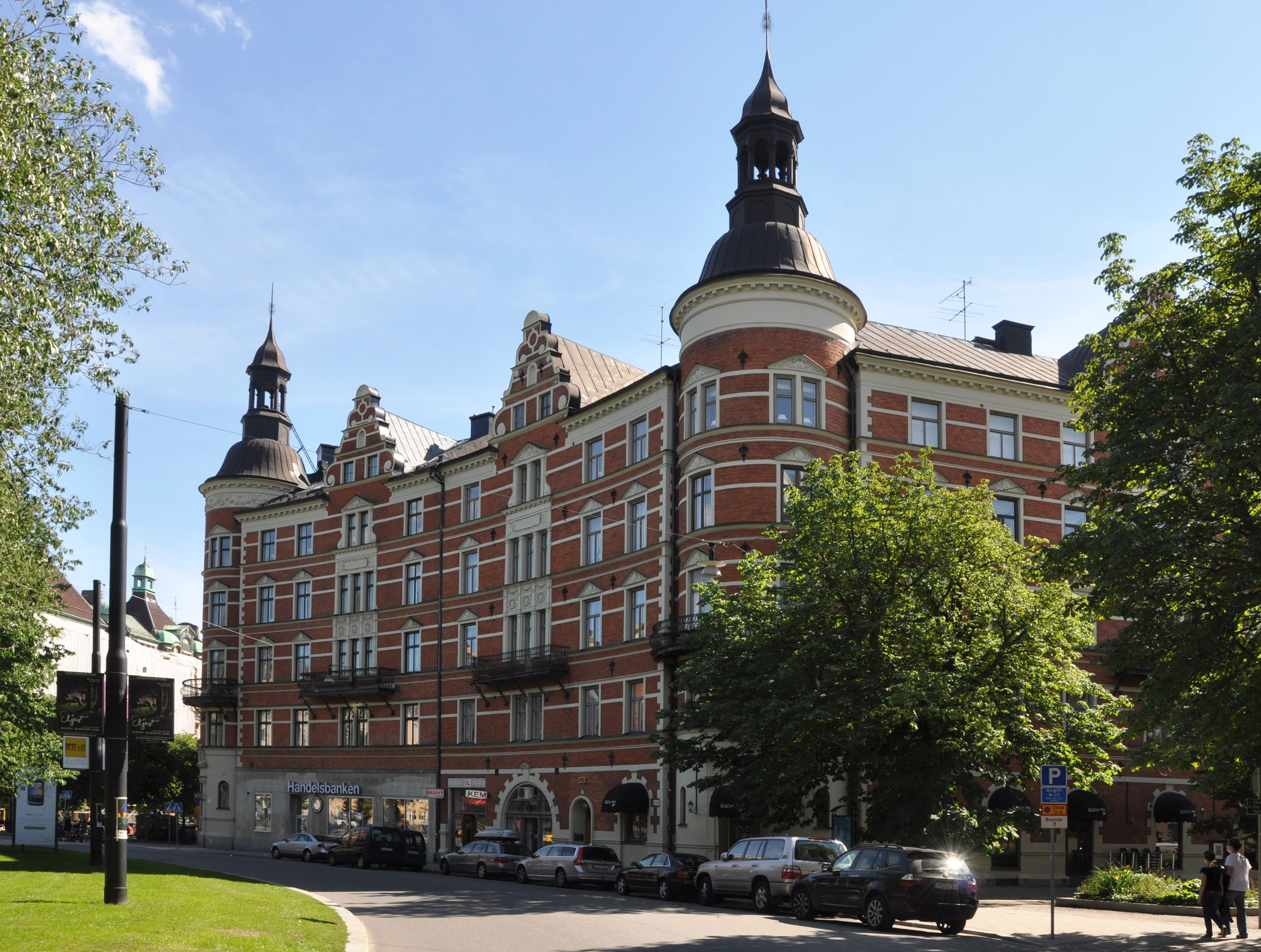
- Strandvägen Engelbrekt Church Östermalm Saluhall Karlaplan
- Interactive map outlining Östermalm
- Country: Sweden
- County: Stockholm
- Municipality: Stockholm

Östermalm (Swedish pronunciation: [œstɛrˈmalm]; lit. 'Eastern city-borough') is a 2.56 km^{2} large district in central Stockholm, Sweden. With 71,802 inhabitants, it is one of Sweden's most populous and exclusive districts. It is an extremely expensive area, having the highest housing prices in Sweden.

== History ==
During the reign of the ruler of all of Scandinavia, king Eric of Pomerania in the early 15th century, a royal cowshed/barn was erected on the lands of the village Vädla. Since the town of Stockholm had grown and started to encroach on the borders of that village, there were many complaints about animals causing damage in the town. In the 17th century, the inhabitants of Stockholm were allowed to keep their cattle there. In 1639, parts of the allocated land for the cowshed/barn were put up for development. In 1672 the eastern part became a military exercise field. For the following 200 years, it was the home of some higher officers, but most inhabitants were poor.

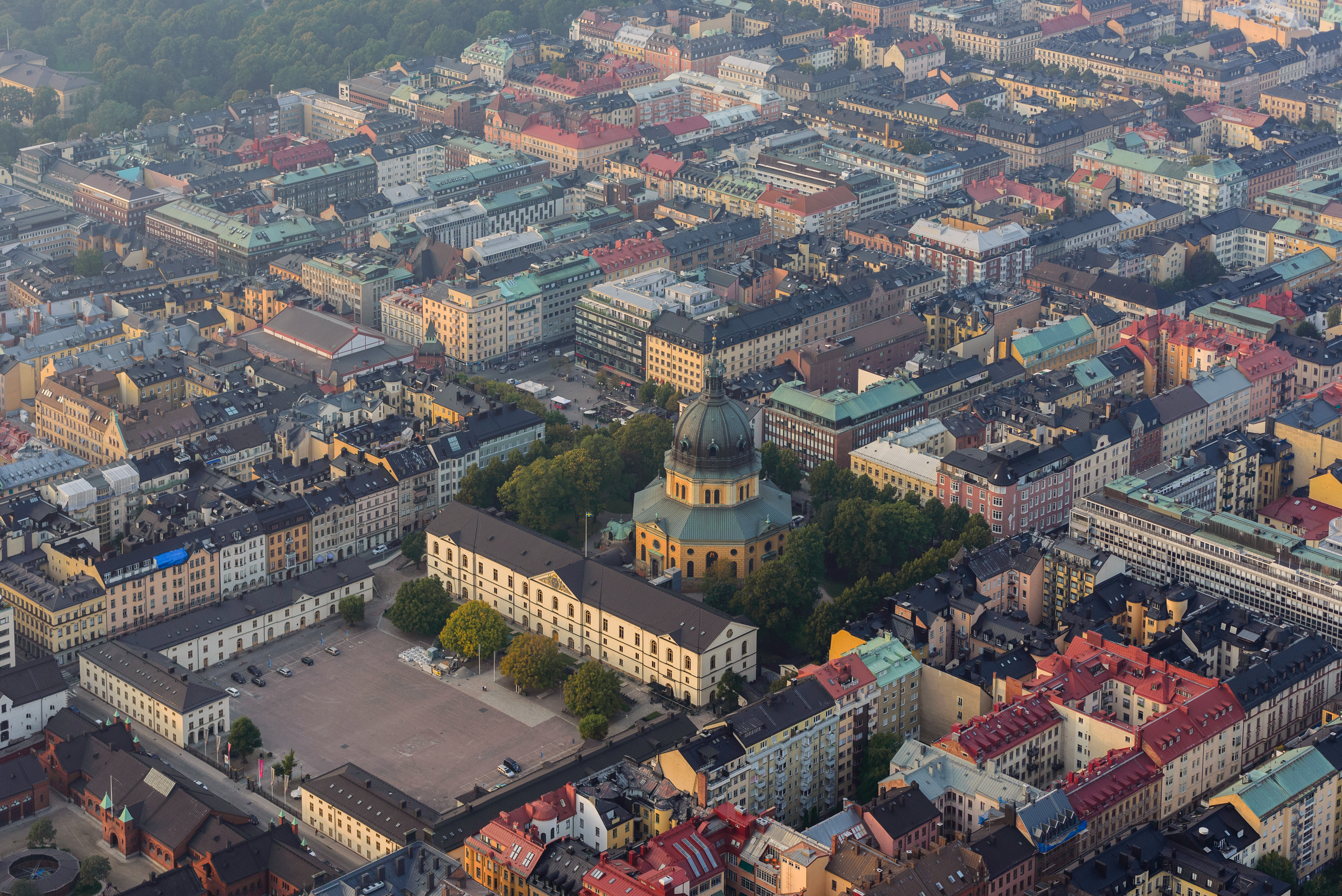
September 2014 aerial view of central Östermalm

A new town plan presented around 1880 implied a grid of streets and avenues that was to become lined with elegant houses, with 4–6 floors. When the plan was implemented, it ended the rustic appearance of the district. The old official name "Ladugårdslandet" (literal meaning "The Barn Land") was replaced with "Östermalm" (literal meaning Eastern Outer City). Since the Crown had been the owner of parts of the district for centuries, a number of official buildings, museums and higher public educational institutions were located in the area. In the 20th century, a large number of embassies, including those of America, Britain, France, Germany, Poland, Thailand, Norway and Malaysia were established in Östermalm.

The Berwaldhallen (1979), home of both the Swedish Radio Symphony Orchestra and the Swedish Radio Choir, is situated on Dag Hammarskjölds väg, Östermalm.

== Sites of interest ==
=== Buildings ===
- Berwaldhallen
- Embassy of the United Kingdom
- Engelbrekt Church
- Kaknästornet
- KTH Royal Institute of Technology
- Maritime Museum
- National Library of Sweden
- Royal Dramatic Theatre, Dramaten
- Sophiahemmet
- Stockholm Olympic Stadium
- Stockholms tekniska gymnasium
- St Peter and St Sigfrid's Church, also known as the English Church in Stockholm
- Swedish Armed Forces Headquarters

=== Neighbourhoods ===
- Diplomatstaden
- Eriksberg
- Lärkstaden
- Nedre Östermalm
- Villastaden
- Övre Östermalm

=== Railway stations ===
- Karlaplan: Metro 13
- Stadion: Metro 14
- Stockholms östra/Tekniska Högskolan: suburban railway 27, 28, 29 (Roslagsbanan) and Metro 14
- Östermalmstorg: Metro 13, 14

=== Parks ===
- Gustav Adolfsparken
- Humlegården
- Stureparken
- Spiltan
- Tessinparken
- Berzelii Park
- Nobelparken

== See also ==
- Geography of Stockholm
