= Stureparken =

Park in Stockholm, Sweden

Coordinates: 59°20′32.65″N 18°4′38.57″E

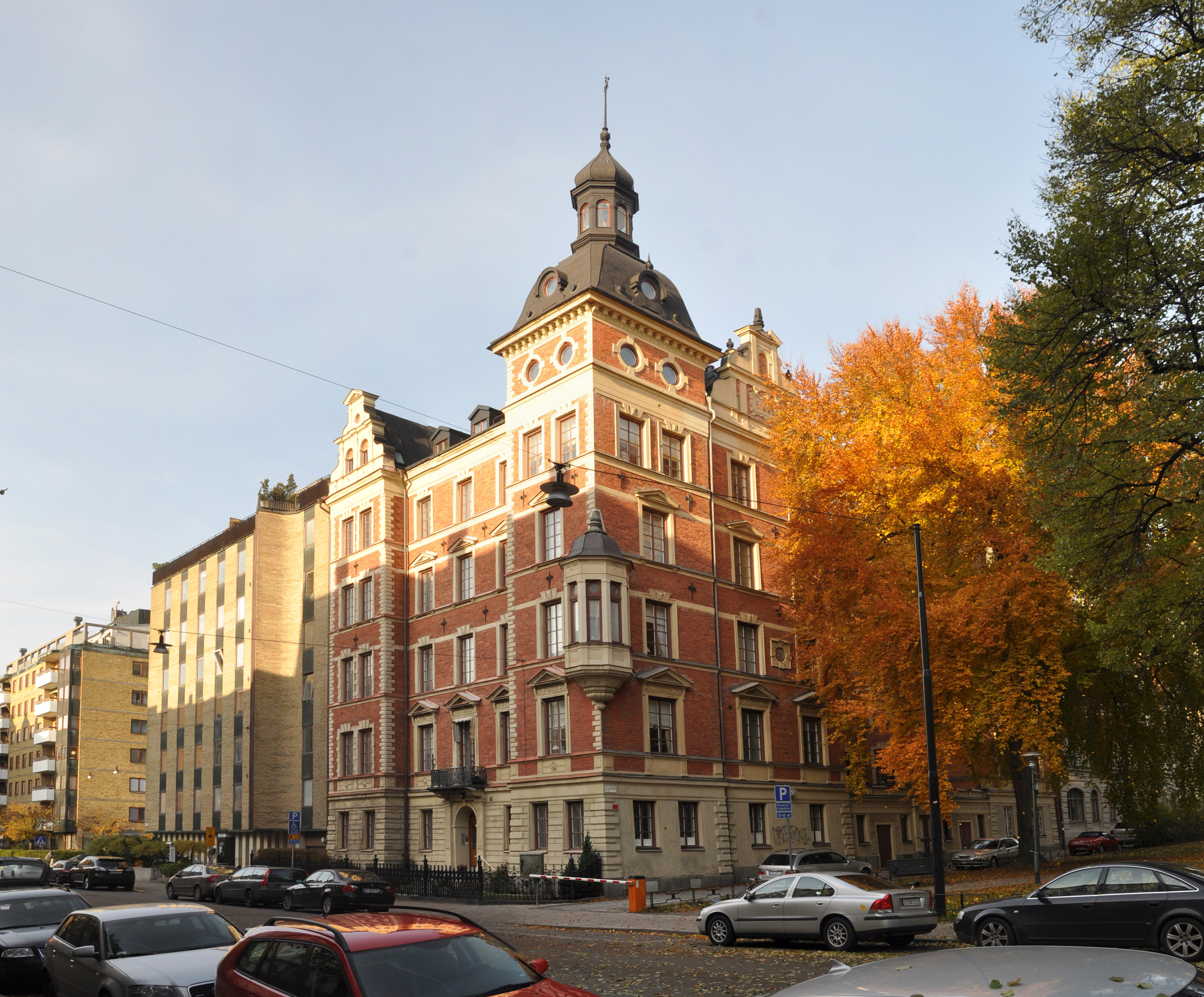
Rosenborgshuset

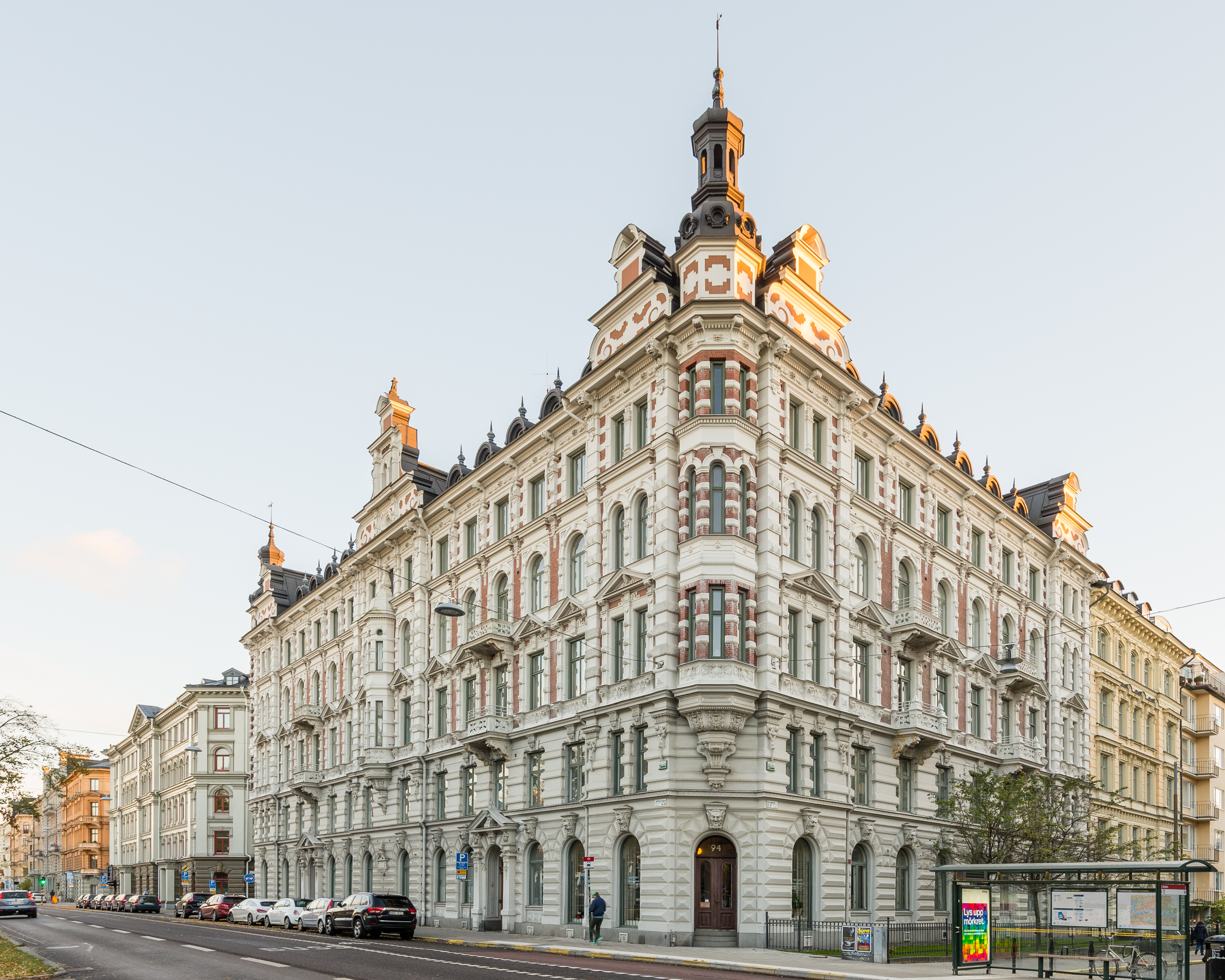
Björken 18

Stureparken is a small park in the borough of Östermalm in Stockholm, Sweden. The park is situated at the corner of Östermalmsgatan / Sturegatan. The park began construction in 1906. Stureparken is surrounded by several architecturally interesting buildings. Included are the residential buildings Björken 18 which was designed by architect Fredrik Dahlberg and built between 1885 and 1886 and Rosenborgshuset which was designed by Ferdinand Boberg and built between 1883 and 1884.
