= Fausto Acke =

Swedish gymnast

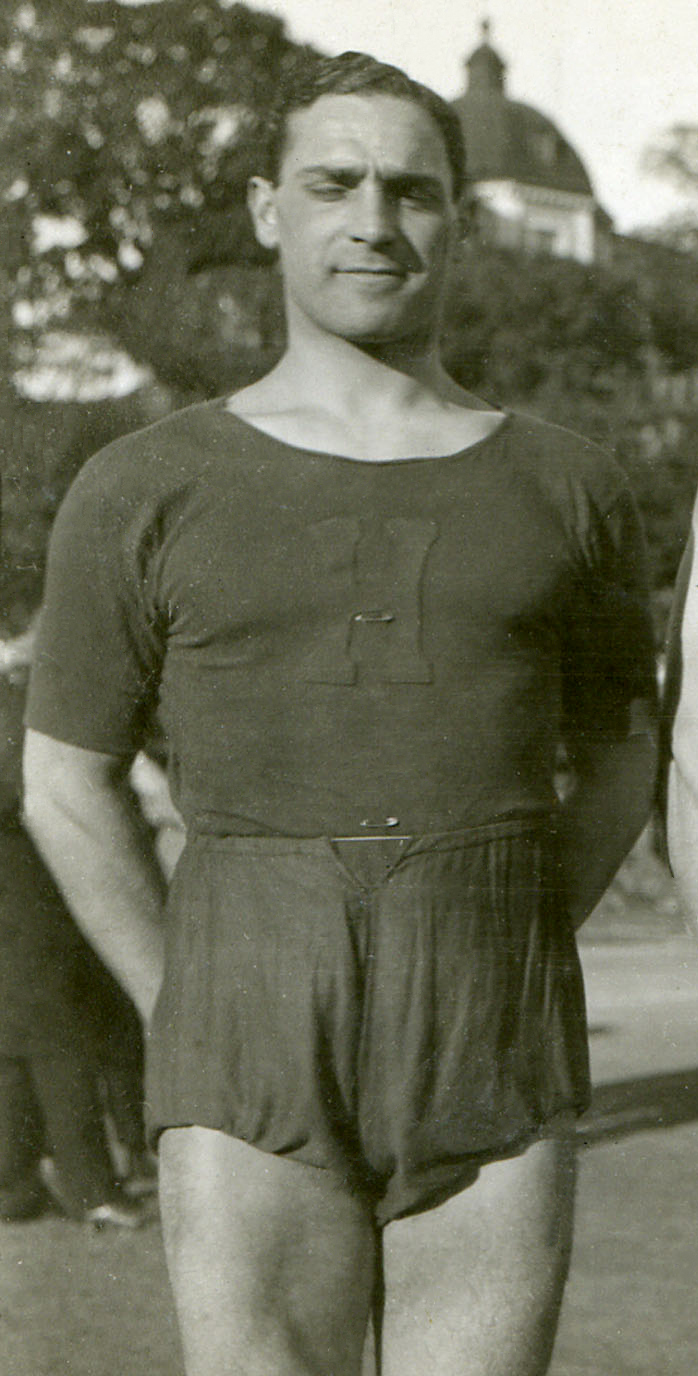
- Acke in 1919

Personal information
- Full name: Fausto Alesio Acke
- Alternative name: Fausto Alesio Padovini
- Born: 23 May 1897 Rome, Kingdom of Italy
- Died: 14 May 1967 (aged 69) Hollywood, Los Angeles, California, US

Gymnastics career
- Discipline: Men's artistic gymnastics
- Country represented: Sweden
- Club: Stockholms Gymnastikförening
Medal record
Men's artistic gymnastics
Representing Sweden
Olympic Games
Gold medal – first place	1920 Antwerp	Team, Swedish system

Fausto Alesio Acke (born Padovini, 23 May 1897 – 14 May 1967) was an Italian-born Swedish gymnast and discus thrower. Born in Rome he was adopted in 1903 by family friends, after his parents died during an epidemic. His adoptive parents were the Swedish Impressionist painter J. A. G. Acke and Eva Acke (née Topelius), the daughter of the Finnish-Swedish author Zacharias Topelius. Acke was raised in Vaxholm. At the 1920 Summer Olympics, he was part of the Swedish team that won the gold medal in the Swedish system event. He later moved to the Hollywood, where he worked in the movie industry, married sculptor Gerdis Sung, and died aged 69.
