= Rikard Lindström =

Swedish painter, graphic artist and writer

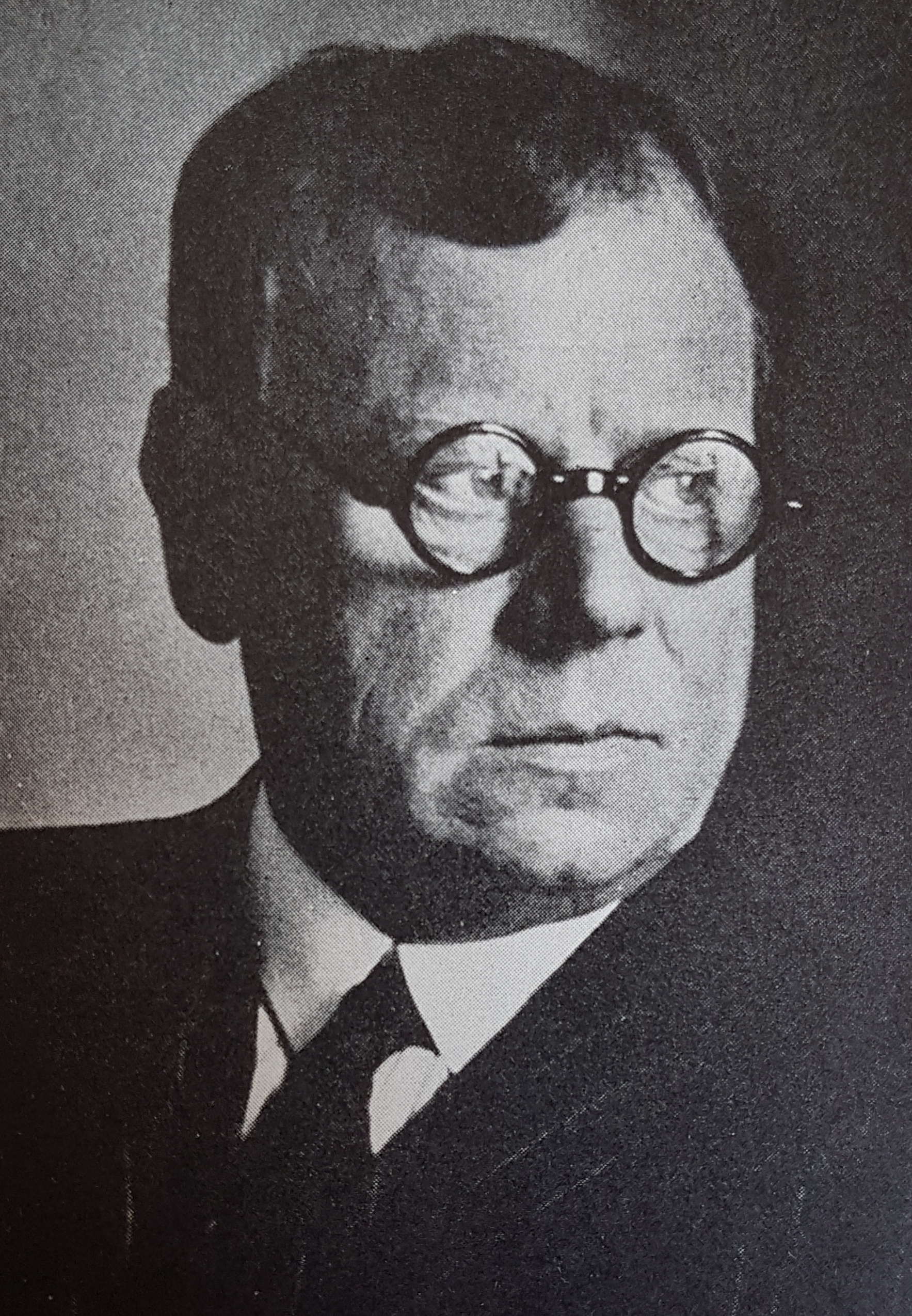
Rikard Lindström

Rikard Magnus Lindström (28 September 1882, Stockholm - 20 October 1943, Stockholm) was a Swedish painter, graphic artist and writer best known for his nautical scenes.

== Biography ==
His father, Albert Esaias Lindström, was a composer and organist. After receiving some free lessons from Caleb Althin, he began his formal studies in 1901, at the Royal Swedish Academy of Fine Arts. From 1902 to 1905, he studied with Kristian Zahrtmann in Copenhagen. He also took several study trips to Paris. Since he was a boy, he had been interested in nautical subjects, and even served some time as a "Royal Mail Sailor". As an adult, he roamed along the Scandinavian coast and seascapes came to dominate his output. He was especially fond of Åland and Lofoten, and often depicted sailing ships.

He became one of the last members of the Konstnärsförbundet, an artists' association that was opposed to the traditional methods of the Royal Academy. His first exhibition with that group came in 1907. He also held several exhibitions at the Gummeson Gallery (1920s-30s), Liljevalchs konsthall (1924), and the Konstnärshuset (1938 and 1941), as well as a joint exhibition with J.A.G. Acke in 1913. Under the auspices of the General Art Association, he took part in group exhibitions overseas; notably in Berlin, Venice, and the United States.

In addition to his canvases, he provided illustrations for short stories by August Strindberg. He also produced regular columns for Dagens Nyheter and articles for Morgonbris. In 1923, he published a novel: Jakob Tengberghs öde.

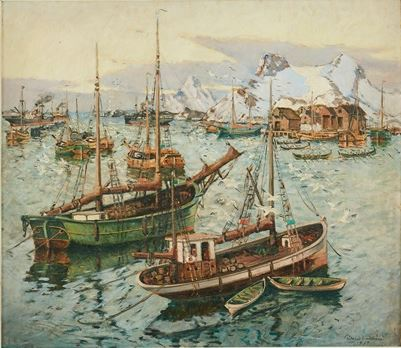
Fishing Boats in the Harbor

From 1907 to 1915, he was married to the artist, Martha Rydell; daughter of a sea captain. She later became a journalist. After their divorce, they continued to live together.

His works may be seen at the Moderna museet, the Göteborgs konstmuseum, the Sjöhistoriska museet and the Nordnorsk Kunstmuseum, among many others.
