= Eva Acke =

Finnish painter (1855–1929)

Eva Maria Acke
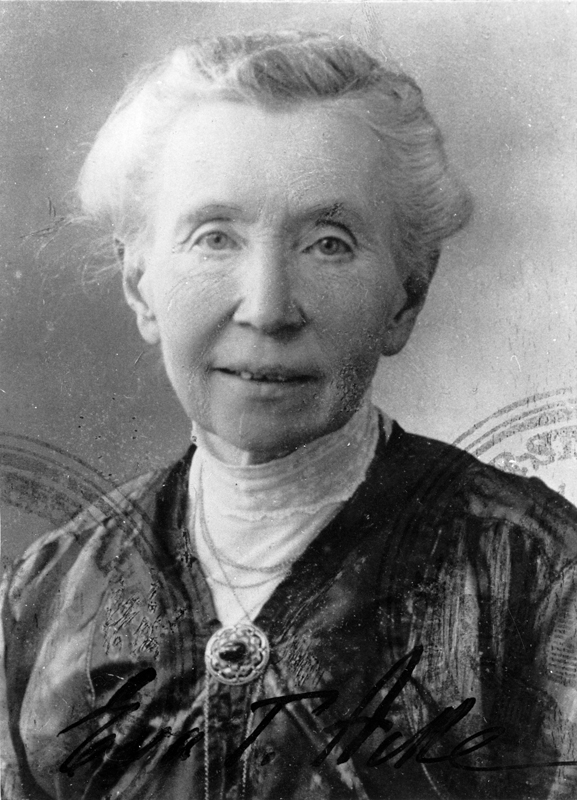
- Photograph of the Finnish artist Eva Maria Acke (circa 1920)
- Born: 4 September 1855; Nykarleby, Grand Duchy of Finland, Russian Empire
- Died: 23 March 1929 (aged 73); Vaxholm, Sweden
- Known for: Painting
- Style: Watercolor

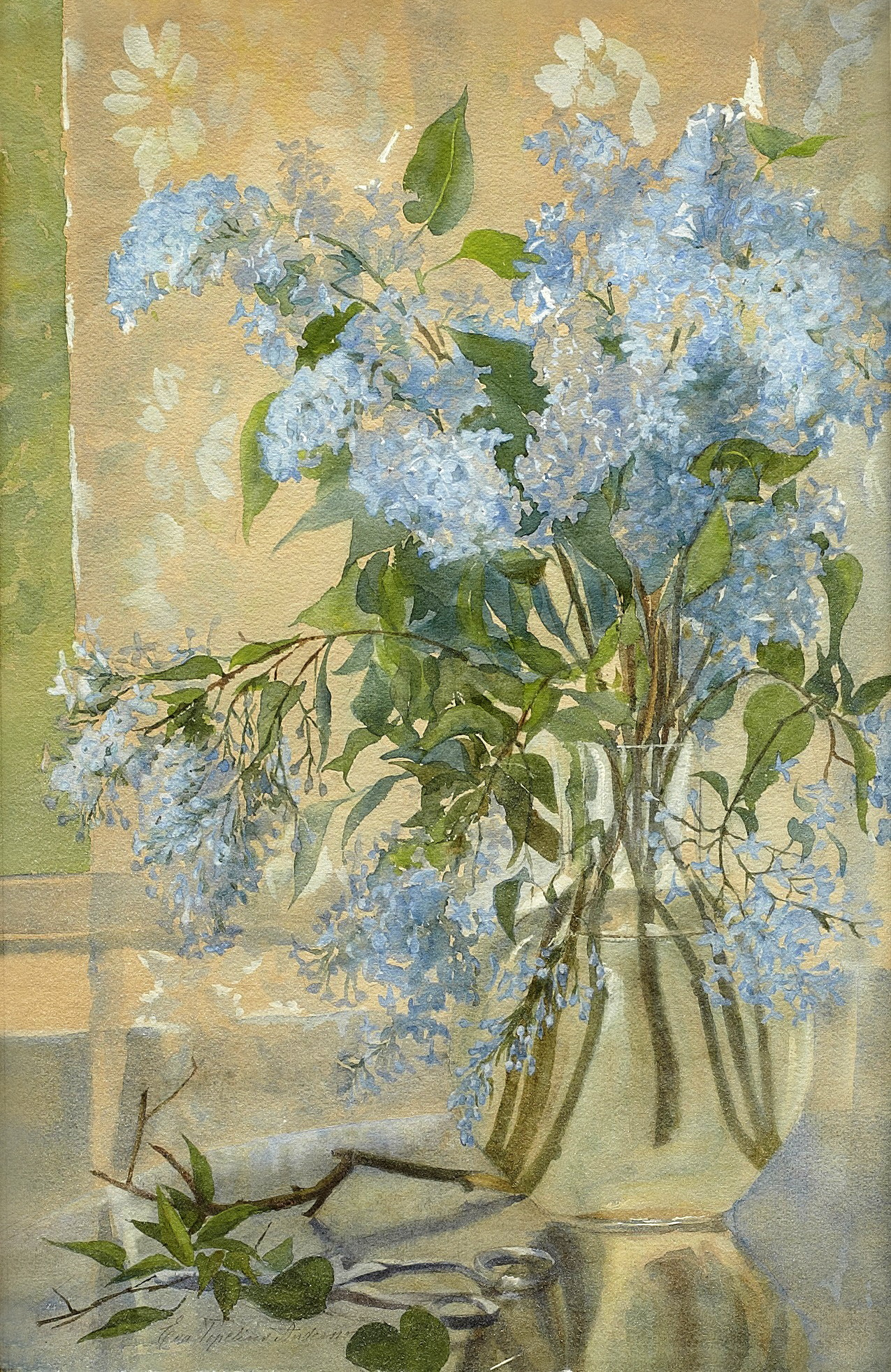
Lilacs

Eva Maria Acke née Topelius (4 September 1855 – 23 March 1929) was a Finnish painter who created her best known work while living in Sweden. She specialized in watercolors.

== Biography ==
She was born in a largely Swedish-speaking community in Nykarleby, Finland. Her father was the author, journalist and historian Zachris Topelius. He was of a liberal disposition and wanted to teach his daughters more than they would need to know to be housewives. As a result, she came into contact with many leading cultural figures while still a child. Most of her schooling was at home, but she also attended a girls' school in Helsinki. Her first formal art lessons began in Stockholm in 1871. She continued her studies at the Finnish Art Association's drawing school (now part of the Academy of Fine Arts). Later, she studied privately with Carl Møller in Copenhagen and Luigi Premazzi in St. Petersburg. In 1884, she accompanied her father to Italy and painted watercolor landscapes.

She spent a few summers painting on Åland where she participated in the Önningebykolonin, a Finnish-Swedish art colony. She made many friends there, including J.A.G. Acke and Anna Wengberg, who both paid visits to her father's home. Johan and Anna had discussed marriage, but he eventually decided to marry Eva. They were wed in 1891 and moved to Uppsala, where he was restoring artworks at the Uppsala Cathedral. They continued to visit the art colony for a time, but their visits slowly became less frequent. They divided their time between Finland and Sweden, until her father died, then spent virtually all their time in Sweden. She joined the Swedish women's association Nya Idun in 1894.

In 1901, they settled in Vaxholm at the Villa Akleja. They had no children of their own but, during a trip to Italy, they met an Italian boy, Fausto Padovini, whom they adopted in 1903. He later became an Olympic gold-medallist. In 1914, they could afford to build a summer home, the Villa Torsvi in Nynäshamn, south of Stockholm.

As was common then, she allowed Johan to place his career ahead of hers; although he did promote her works and, occasionally, they painted together. After his death from a heart condition in 1924, she continued to paint and exhibit; both in Finland and at the Royal Swedish Academy of Fine Arts, but died in Vaxholm, Sweden, only five years later, in 1929.
