= Anna Wengberg =

Swedish painter (1865–1936)

Anna Emelia Elisa Wengberg
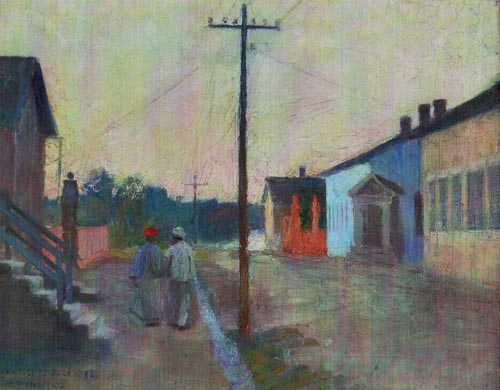
- The Kyrkogatan street in Nykarleby, (1892). The walking couple is Eva and J. A. G. Acke
- Born: Anna Emelia Elisa Wengberg; 24 April 1865; Ystad, Sweden
- Died: 13 October 1936 (aged 71)
- Known for: Painter
- Movement: Realism

Anna Emelia Elisa Wengberg (24 April 1865 – 13 October 1936) was a Swedish painter specializing in portraits, who was a member of the Önningeby artists colony on the Finnish island of Åland. Her works are in the collections of the National Museum of Fine Arts in Stockholm and the Helsingborg Museum.

== Biography ==
=== Early life and education ===
Born on 24 April 1865 in Ystad, Sweden, Wengberg was the daughter of Per August Wengberg and Emilia Sophia Carlheim-Gyllensköld. There in Skåne County she grew up and took her first drawing classes when she was nine years old, and later her oil painting classes under Herman Buuth. There is a drawing portrait of her father (1880) from that early period. She studied under Edvard Perséus in Stockholm (ca. 1884) and Bengt Nordenberg in Düsseldorf (in 1884-1887), as well as in Paris (winter of 1890) under various teachers of Académie Colarossi, particularly Jean André Rixens and Gustave-Claude-Etienne Courtois.

=== Finland and the Önningeby artists' colony ===
It was during her studies in Germany, when she met Finnish painter Victor Westerholm, who had a great influence on her life. In 1888, Victor Westerholm invited her to Önningeby village. She became an active member of the Önningeby artists' colony on the island of Åland where she became a friend of Eva Acke, daughter of Zachris Topelius. Her 1893 painting of Önningeby shows Acke strolling with J. A. G. Acke, her husband to be. She spent a year in Finland (in 1888–1889) and at least four summers in the colony and returned to Önningeby as late as 1920 as evidenced by one of her paintings. However, according to other source, she made her last visit to the colony in 1894.

From 1890 to 1894 she lived in Finland. She stayed with Eva Acke at Björkudden, in Åland Islands, Nykarleby, on the islands off Hanko and Helsinki. Every autumn she had exhibitions in Helsinki and Turku. During her years in Finland she had an opportunity to meet some of the most prominent Finnish artistic workers, painters Albert Edelfelt, Eero Järnefelt, Helene Schjerfbeck, Venny Soldan-Brofeldt and Maria Wiik, sculptor Walter Runeberg.

In 1928, Wengberg exhibited in the Turku Art Museum.

=== Back to Sweden ===
After Finland, Wengberg returned to Sweden, and spent most of life in her home country, especially in Helsingborg, and also traveling to various parts of it for painting.

Wengberg first exhibited in Sweden in 1903, and subsequently in 1915–1920, 1922–1923, 1927 and 1929. A memorial exhibition was organised at the Helsingborg Museum in 1937, one year after her death.

== Style and works ==
Anna Wengberg was drawing with pencil and pastel and painting portraits and landscapes with oil on canvas and panel, as well as watercolors, often painting brightly coloured portraits. Her works are deposited at the Helsingborg Museum, Malmö Museum, National Museum of Sweden, Åland Art Museum, Önningeby Museum, Ålands Försakringsbolag, Andersudde and Turku Art Museum.

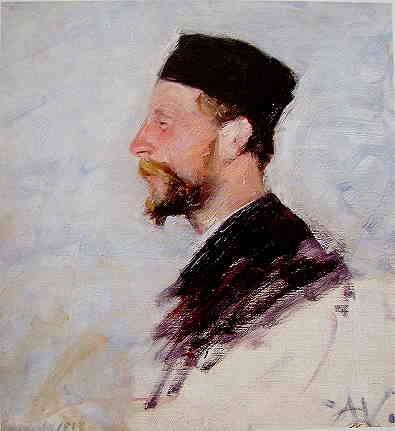
Portrait of J.A.G. Acke, 1888

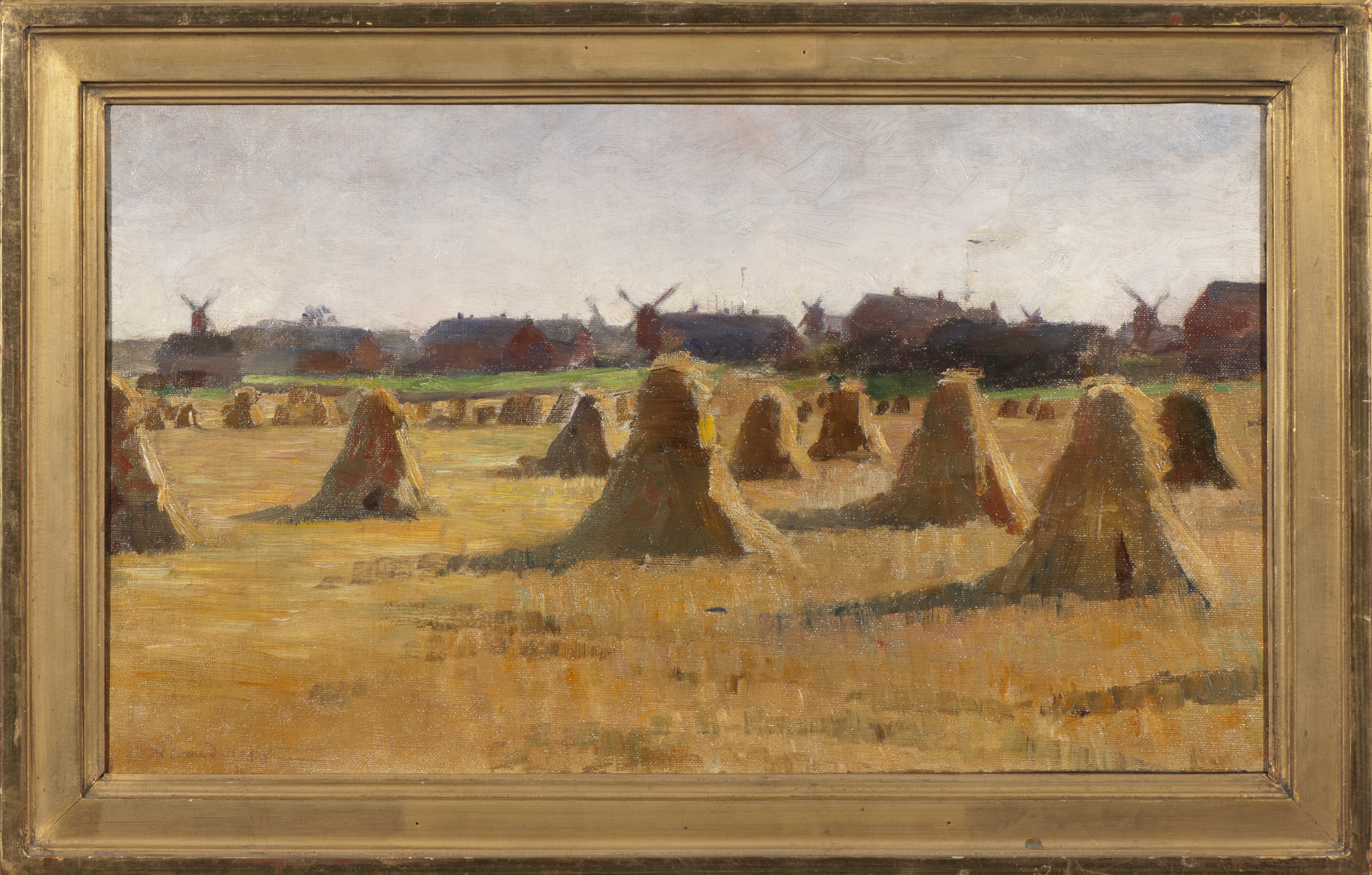
Önningeby, 1888; oil on canvas; National Museum of Sweden

=== List of works ===
- Anatomy Studies, Düsseldorf
- Portrait of Karin Nyberg
- Cow Parsley
- Portrait of J. A. G. Acke, 1888
- Portrait of Anna-Lisa Westerholm
- Maria from Björkudden at the Spinning Wheel
- Portrait of Acke Sjöstrand
- Käringsund, Eckerö, 1888
- At Olle's Cottage, Önningeby
- The Ers Farm in Önningeby
- View over Önningeby
- Interior, Paris, 1890
- Portrait of Helmi Sjöstrand, 1891
- The Kyrkogatan street in Nykarleby, 1892
- Portrait of Eva Topelius-Acke, 1895
- Portrait of Gerda Busoni
- The Craftsman, 1899
- Log Driving, 1900
- The Village Road, Önningeby, 1910
- Storm on the Lake Mistelsjön, 1916
- Maypole and Windmills in Önningeby, 1921
- Landscape in Önningeby, 1923
- A Woman Knitting
- Interior with a Woman
