= Engelbrekt Church =

- Engelbrektskyrkan
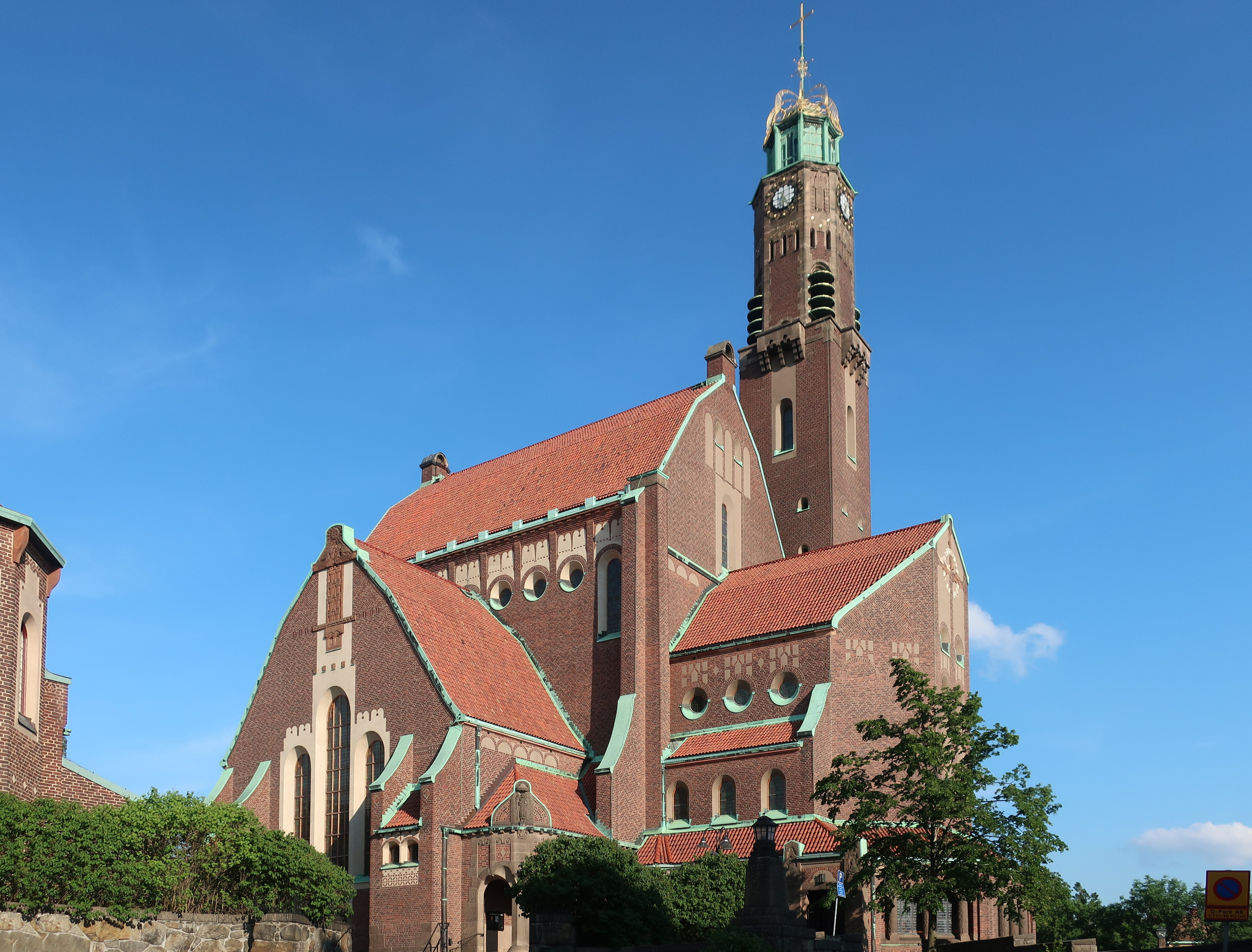
- Engelbrekt Church
- Engelbrekt Church
- 59°20′39″N 18°04′04″E
- Location: Lärkstaden, Stockholm
- Country: Sweden
- Denomination: Lutheran, Church of Sweden
- Website: svenskakyrkan.se/engelbrekt

Architecture
- Architect: Lars Israel Wahlman
- Style: National Romantic style
- Groundbreaking: 14 May 1910
- Completed: 25 January 1914

Administration
- Diocese: Diocese of Stockholm
- Parish: Engelbrekt Parish

Engelbrekt Church (Swedish: Engelbrektskyrkan) is a protected church located in the Lärkstaden area of Stockholm, Sweden. It belongs to the Evangelical-Lutheran Church of Sweden and is a parish church for Engelbrekt Parish in the Diocese of Stockholm. It was designed by architect Lars Israel Wahlman in the National Romantic style and completed in 1914. It is one of the largest churches in Stockholm, with 1,400 seats.

In the spirit of romantic nationalism, the church was named after Engelbrekt Engelbrektsson – a Swedish 15th century rebel leader and national hero. It was built atop a hill in the years 1910–14, after a design competition held in 1906. The rock on which the church is standing was left mostly intact, in accordance to the urban planning ideals at the time, giving it a naturally elevated position in the city.

The building has some features common to Byzantine architecture and has a cruciform architectural plan with a 32 m (105 ft) high nave, making it the highest in Scandinavia. Internationally appreciated in architectural circles, the church has not been subjected to any major changes since its inauguration and is regarded as a paragon of the Swedish Art Nouveau era and the National Romantic style.

The offering of the Mass at Engelbrekt Church on All Souls Day

Aerial view

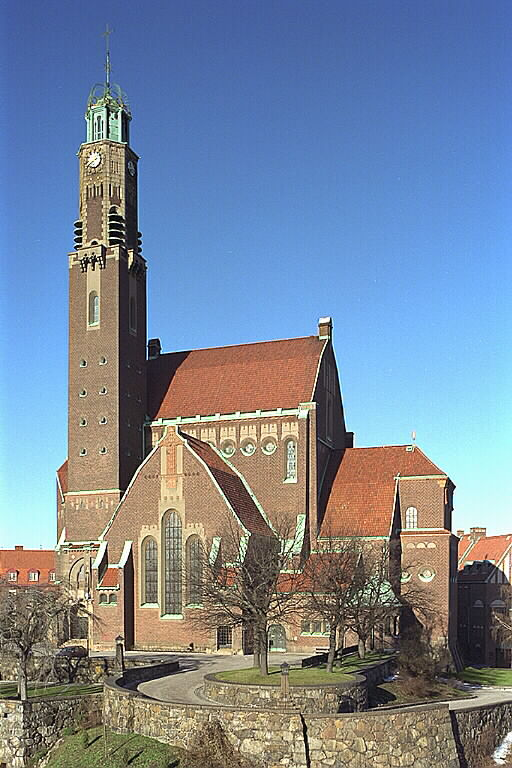
Exterior view

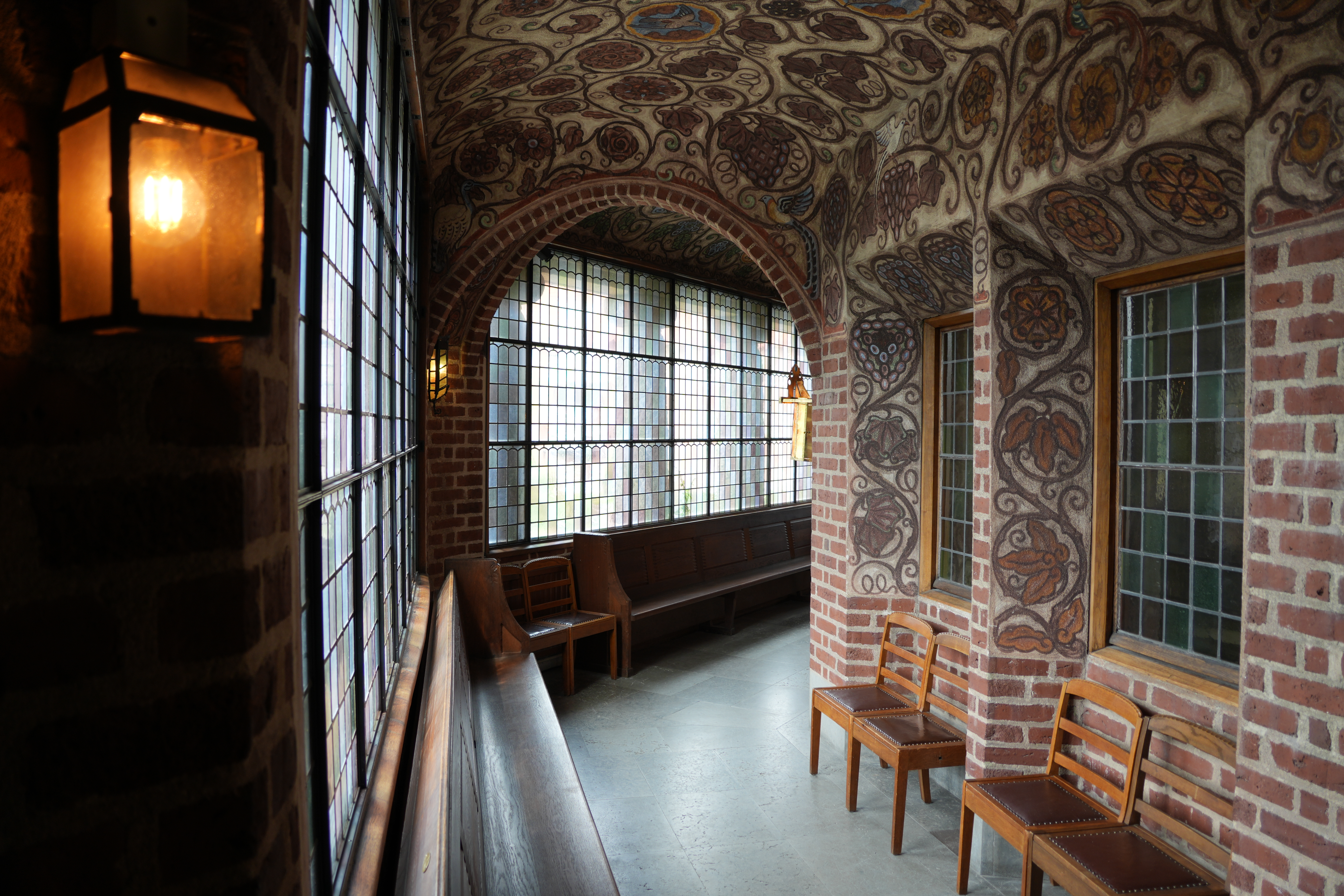
An artistically decorated corridor adjoining the nave of Engelbrekt Church

The faithful lighting votive candles after Mass at Engelbrekt Church

Interior view

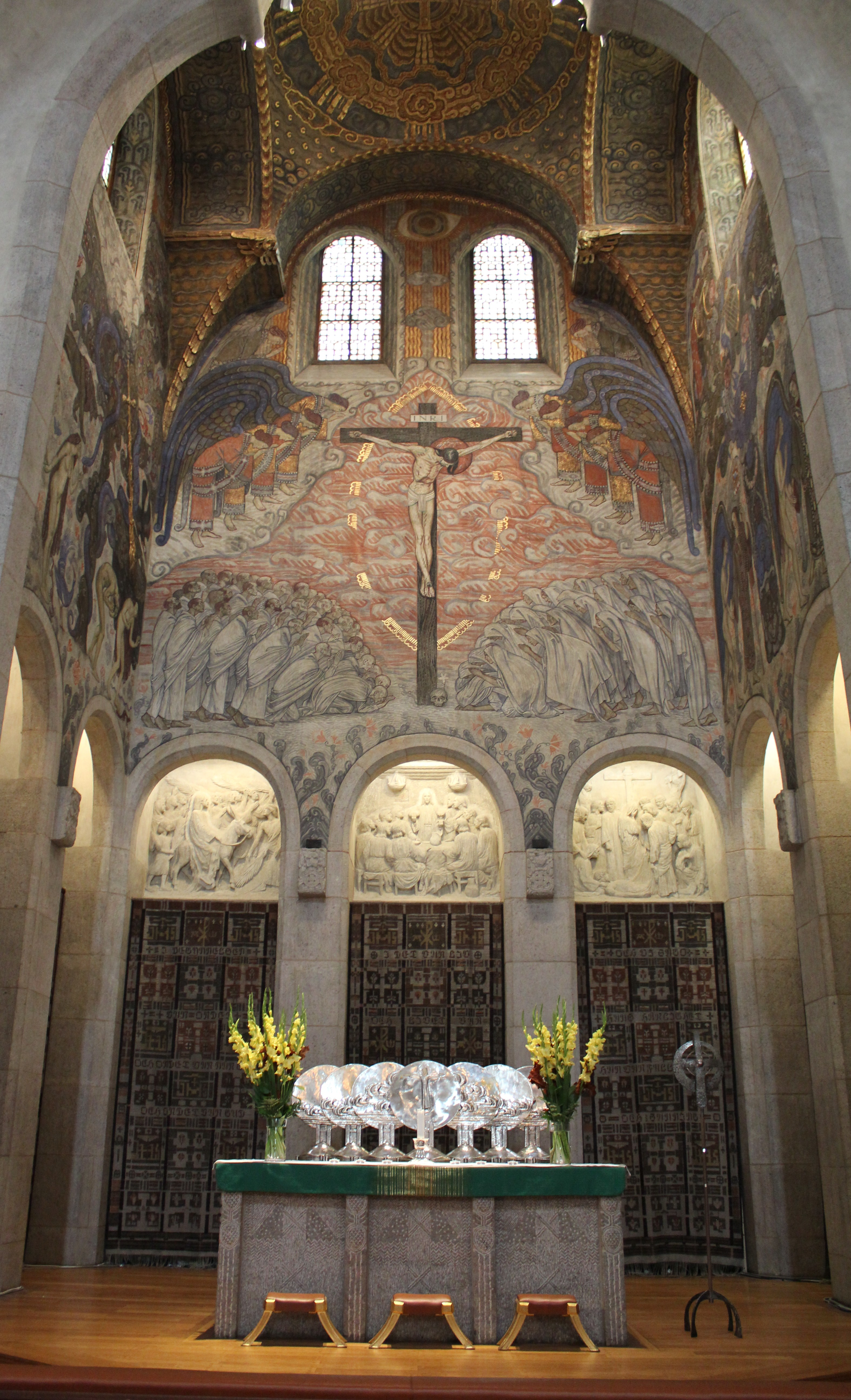
The main altar and chancel altarpiece mural

A fika following Mass at Engelbrekt Church for Christian fellowship

== See also ==
- List of churches in Stockholm
- List of highest church naves
