= Salix balfouriana =

Conservation status
- Least Concern (IUCN 3.1)

Scientific classification
- Kingdom: Plantae
- Clade: Tracheophytes
- Clade: Angiosperms
- Clade: Eudicots
- Clade: Rosids
- Order: Malpighiales
- Family: Salicaceae
- Genus: Salix
- Species: S. balfouriana

Binomial name
- Salix balfouriana C.K.Schneid.

Shrub in the genus of willows

Salix balfouriana is a shrub or small tree from the genus of willow (Salix) with reddish black and tomentose hairy young twigs and up to 8 leaf blades, rarely 18 centimeters long. The natural range of the species is in China.

== Description ==
Salix balfouriana is a shrub or tree up to 5 meters high with reddish black and tomentose hairy young twigs. Biennial twigs are glabrous or slightly hairy. The buds are black-brown and also finely hairy. The leaveshave a 1 to 1.5 centimeter long, finely hairy stem. The leaf blade is 6 to 8, rarely 12 inches long and 2 to 4 inches wide. In young shoots, lengths of up to 18 centimeters are rarely achieved. The blade is elliptical, elliptically elongated or obovate-elongated, with a pointed or blunt tip, rounded or broadly wedge-shaped base and entire or glandular serrated leaf margin. The upper surface of young leaves is rusty brown and tomentose, while older leaves are glabrous and whitish. The underside is dark green, glabrous or downy hairy along the leaf veins. Fallen leaves from the previous year are gray-brown.

Male inflorescences are 2 to rarely 4 centimeters long and 6 to 10 millimeters in diameter catkins are formed. The peduncle is short or absent and may have one or two small leaves at the base. The bracts are obovate-oblong, with a rounded, truncated or notched tip. The upper side of the leaf is glabrous or slightly hairy, the underside is reddish yellow at the tip, hairy and ciliate. Male flowers have an adaxially and an abaxially arranged nectar gland. The two detached stamenshave almost completely hairy stamens and yellow or rarely red anthers. Female inflorescences are up to 8 inches long and have an elongated stem. The female flowers have an adaxial nectar gland. The ovary is sessile, ovate-conical, pubescent and reddish purple. The stylus is long and two-lobed, the scar is in two columns. The fruit forms 5.5 millimeters long, almost bare capsules. Salix balfouriana flowers before or at the same time as the leaves shoot from April to May, the fruits ripen in June and July.

== Range ==
The natural range is in thickets and on mountain slopes at heights of 2800 to 4000 meters in the Chinese province of Sichuan and in the northwest of the Chinese province of Yunnan.

== Taxonomy ==
Salix balfouriana is a species from the genus of willows (Salix) in the willow family (Salicaceae). There, it is the section Psilostigmatae assigned. It was in 1936 by Camillo Karl Schneider scientifically for the first time described. The genus name Salix is Latin and has been from the Romans used for various willow species.

== Literature ==
- Wu Zheng-yi, Peter H. Raven (Ed.): Flora of China. Volume 4: Cycadaceae through Fagaceae. Science Press / Missouri Botanical Garden Press, Beijing / St. Louis 1999, ISBN 0-915279-70-3, pp. 226, 231 (English).
- Helmut Genaust: Etymological dictionary of botanical plant names. 3rd, completely revised and expanded edition. Nikol, Hamburg 2005, ISBN 3-937872-16-7 (reprint from 1996).
