= Salix ernestii =

Scientific classification
- Kingdom: Plantae
- Clade: Tracheophytes
- Clade: Angiosperms
- Clade: Eudicots
- Clade: Rosids
- Order: Malpighiales
- Family: Salicaceae
- Genus: Salix
- Species: S. ernestii

Binomial name
- Salix ernestii C.K. Schneid.

Shrub in the genus of willows

Salix ernestii is a species in the genus of willow (Salix) and grows as a shrub. The leaf blades are about 11 centimeters long. The natural range of the species is in China.

== Description ==
Salix ernestii grows as a shrub. The twigs are initially hairy gray and shaggy and later bald. The buds are long downy-haired. The leaves have a filamentous, hairy petiole up to 1 centimeter long. The leaf blade is elliptical or obovate-elliptical, about 11 centimeters long and 4 centimeters wide. The leaf margin is whole-edged or serrated to the tip inconspicuously glandular, the leaf base is rounded to wedge-shaped, the leaf end rounded, pointed or blunt. The upper side of the leaf is hairy down, the underside with fibrous velvety hairs, later rarely balding. The leaf veins are raised on both leaf sides. Nine to eleven lateral wire pairs are formed per leaf.

The male inflorescences are 4 to 5 centimeters long and about 1 centimeter across catkins. The inflorescence stalk is 1 to 3.5 centimeters long and has normal leaves. The inflorescence axis is hairy shaggy. The bracts are obovate or obovate-oblong, about 2.5 millimeters long, shaggy hairy underneath and have a rounded tip. Male flowers have two nectar glands, the adaxial is wider than the abaxial. There will be two stamensformed with shaggy hairy stamens at the base. The female catkins are thinner than the male and up to 13 centimeters long when the fruit is ripe. Female flowers have an oval, elongated adaxial nectar gland, the abaxial nectar gland is very small or may be absent. The ovary is hairy down. The stylus is about 1.5 millimeters long and divided into two parts. The scar is hairy and usually twisted. The fruits are about 6 millimeters long and finely hairy capsules. Salix ernestii flowers when the leaves shoot in May and June, the fruits ripen from July to August.

== Range ==
The natural range is in Tibet and the Chinese provinces of Sichuan and Yunnan. There it grows on mountain slopes at altitudes of 2700 to 3500 meters.

== Taxonomy ==
Ernestii Salix is a kind from the kind of willow (Salix), in the family of the pasture plants (Salicaceae). There, it is the section Psilostigmatae assigned. It was in 1916 by Camillo Karl Schneider scientifically first described. The epithet honors the English botanist Ernest Henry Wilson. Synonyms of the species are Salix daltoniana var. Franchetiana Burkill, Salix ernestii f. ernestii, Salix ernestii f. glabrescens Y.L. Chou & CF Fang, Salix ernestii var. Wangii (Goerz) N. Chao, Salix franchetiana (Burkill) Hand.-Mazz., Salix pseudoernestii Goerz and Salix wangii Goerz.
