= Sigrid Rissler =

Swedish botanist (1886–1918)

Sigrid Elisabet Alfhild (Andersson) Rissler (2 January 1868 – 31 October 1918) was a Swedish botanist known for her work on monocotyledon anatomy. She studied at Stockholms högskola and published her significant work on vascular bundles in monocot stems in 1888, with self-drawn and lithographed plates that were praised for their exceptional technical accuracy. Besides her scientific work, Rissler was also a skilled artist who designed Art Nouveau furniture panels and created textile art, with some of her designs being preserved in Sweden's Nationalmuseum collection.

== Biography ==
Sigrid Elisabet Alfhild Andersson was born on 2 January 1868 in Stockholm. Her parents were Anna Elisabeth Amanda (nee Tigerhielm) and Nils Johan Andersson. Her father was a professor of botany at Lund University, and also worked at the Riksmuseum in Stockholm.

Andersson enrolled at Stockholms högskola in 1885 and completed three years of systematic botany and chemistry under professors V.B. Wittrock and Gustaf Lagerheim; Wittrock later communicated her first paper, on the ontogeny of primary vascular bundles in monocot stems, to the Royal Swedish Academy's proceedings in 1887. The plates in that study were drawn and lithographed by Rissler herself and were praised by Botaniska Notiser (1889) for their "extraordinary accuracy in rendering scalariform thickenings". After graduation she spent two years in the histology laboratory at the Karolinska Institute, preparing serial sections of cereal seedlings for Julius von Sachs's comparative root-anatomy project, before marrying physician John G. Rissler in 1895. Rissler later became chief of the Sabbatsberg Hospital, in 1895. The couple had three children together: Maj-lis (Maria Elisabet) Rissler (1902–1987), Bo Rissler (1904–1981), and Gerd Elisabeth Rissler (1909–1996). Rissler died 31 October 1918 in Stockholm.

== Illustration and applied art ==
In parallel with scientific work she attended evening classes at Stockholm's Technical School, specialising in Art Nouveau plant ornament. Between 1898 and 1904 she designed intarsia panels and furniture fronts for the cabinet-maker A. J. Iversen; a portfolio of nineteen water-colours survives in the Nationalmuseum's design collection and several were included in the museum's touring exhibition Jugend (1954). Rissler also embroidered her own wedding dress and repoussé bridal crown, both now catalogued in the Nordiska museet's textile holdings.

== Legacy ==
Although family duties curtailed further publications, later Swedish floristic works continued to cite "Andersson 1888" as the standard reference for early monocot vasculature. A short obituary in Svensk Botanisk Tidskrift (1919) noted that "her dual talent for micro-anatomy and line illustration set a benchmark for student theses at the högskola for the next generation". Her herbarium sheets—mostly Carex and Juncus from Uppland and Lapland—were deposited in 1920 at the Swedish Museum of Natural History, where they are still consulted for type comparisons in the Flora Nordica project.

== Selected publications ==
- Rissler, Sigrid Alfhild Elizabeth (1888). Om de primära kärlsträngarnes utveckling hos monokotyledonerna (in Swedish). OCLC 191964460.
