= Stockholms tekniska gymnasium =

Charter school in Östermalm, Sweden

Coordinates: 59.3400°N 18.0890°E

Stockholms Tekniska Gymnasium (Stockholm Technical Upper Secondary School) is a charter school that is located in the district of Östermalm, close to the Stadion metro station in the Swedish capital of Stockholm. The upper secondary school belongs to Thoren Innovation School (TIS) which in turn is a part of Thorengruppen. Before Thorengruppen acquired TIS in 2012, it belonged to Lernia AB.

As of 21 August 2014, there are approximately 250 students that are studying in Stockholm at Thoren Innovation School.

The school is situated in Löjtnantsgatan 25.

== Programs ==
There are four different types of programs to choose from when someone starts to study in the upper secondary school:

- Tech Program
- Science Program
- IT Program
- Creative Program

Thoren Innovation School in Stockholm cooperates with several institutions offering tertiary education, including the Royal Institute of Technology (KTH), Stockholm University (SU) as well as with various types of companies.

The upper secondary school was in a period of 8 years, from 2002 to 2010, run by STI and was located on the premises by STI on Östermalm.

== Miscellaneous ==
Every student (as well as employees) receives a MacBook Air from the school that they keep until they graduate from Thoren Innovation school, after which the former students will be able to buy the laptop computer from the school for a low price.
