= Lärkstaden =

Coordinates: 59°20′43.35″N 18°4′2.88″E

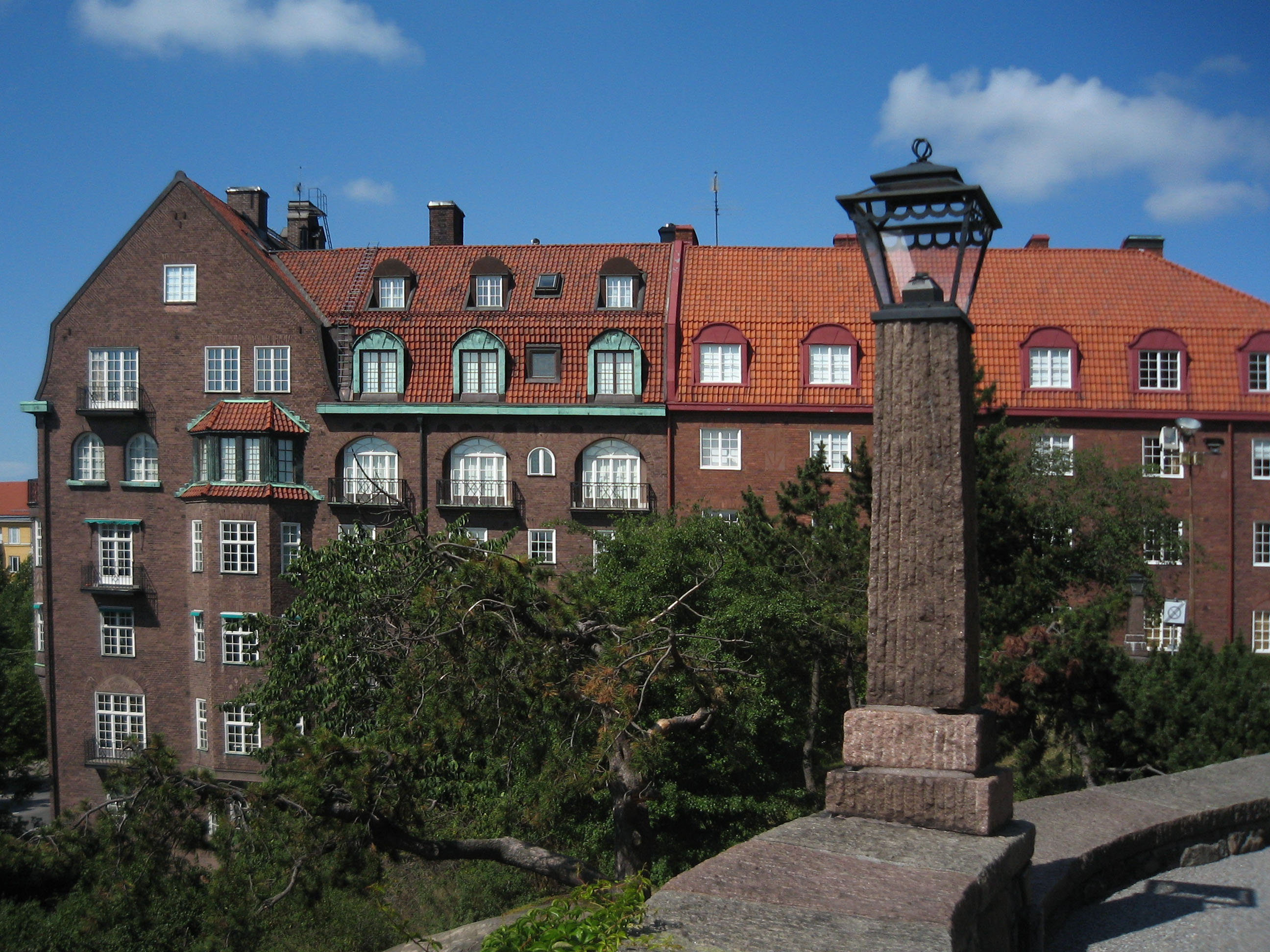
Lärkstaden, Stockholm

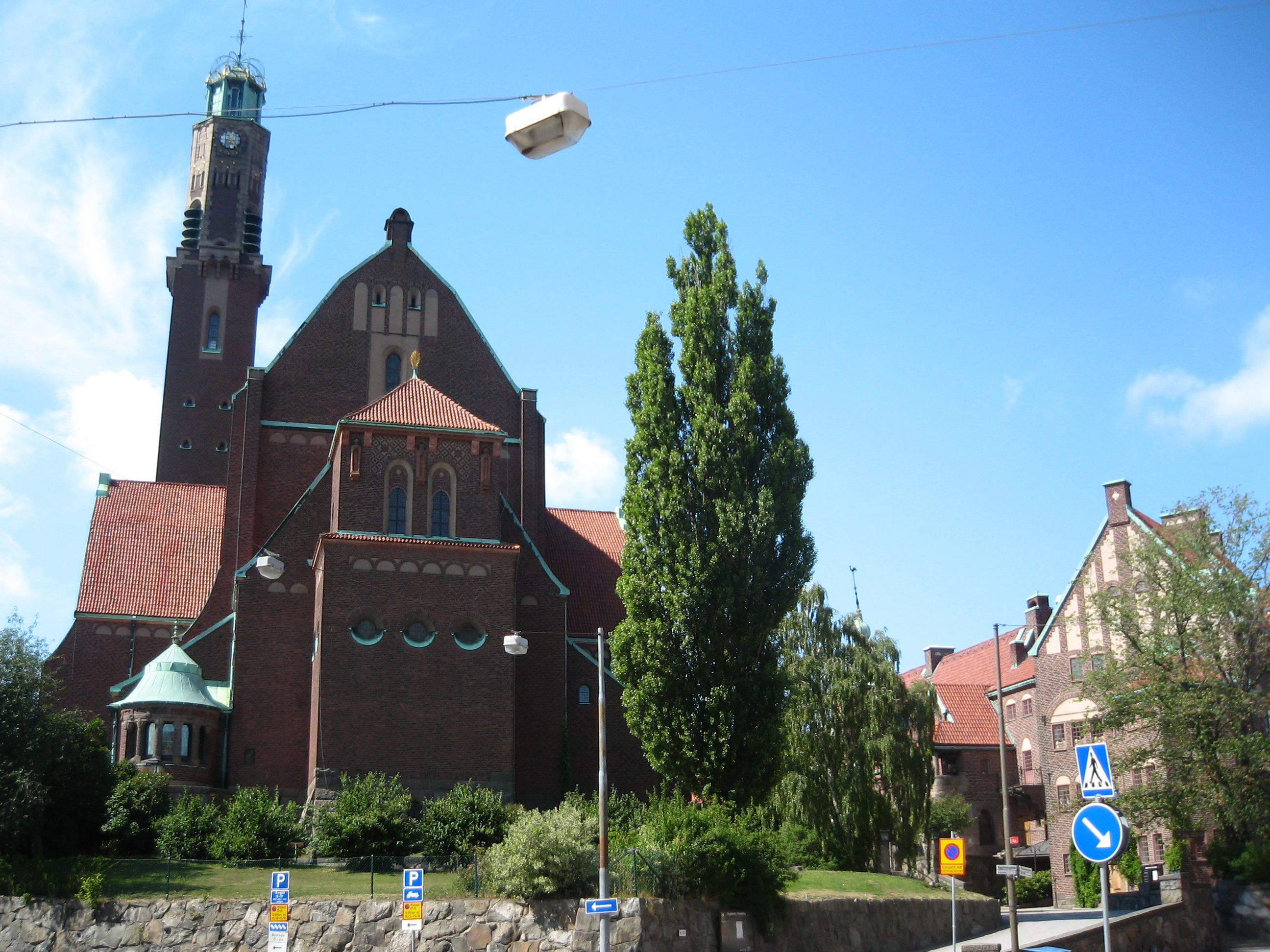
Lärkstaden, Stockholm

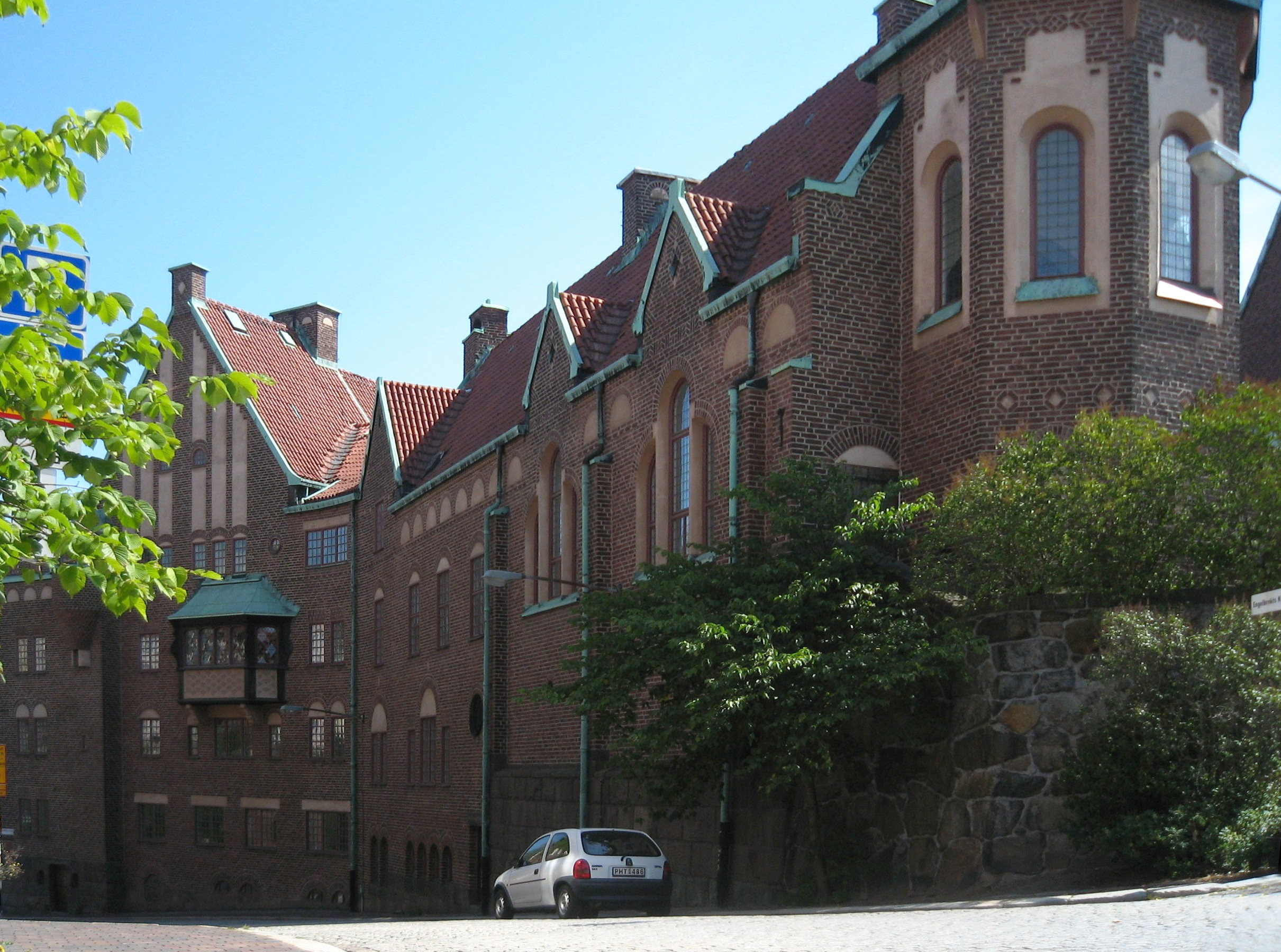
Lärkstaden, Stockholm

Lärkstaden (Swedish for "Lark City") is an urban area within the city district of Östermalm in central Stockholm, Sweden.

The name originates from the large block "Lärkan" which used to dominated the area before the present buildings were built in 1907. Many of the blocks added at this time were given names such as "piplärkan" pipit, "tofslärka" (Crested lark), "trädlärka" Woodlark, and other bird names.

Though the area has no official extent, it is said to be delimited by the streets Odengatan, Karlavägen, Valhallavägen, and Uggelviksgatan, if nothing else because of the contrast between the small-scale character of the neighbourhood and the blocks surrounding it.
