= Nils Johan Andersson =

Swedish botanist and traveller

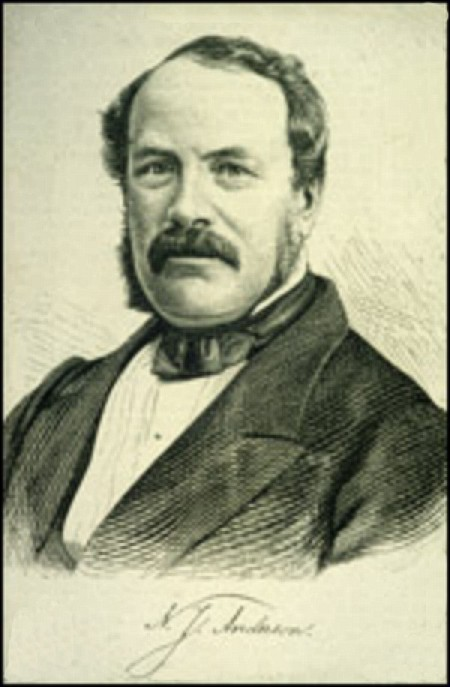
- Andersson, c. 1870
- Born: 20 February 1821; Gärdserum, Småland, Sweden
- Died: 27 March 1880 (aged 59); Stockholm, Sweden
- Occupations: Botanist and traveller
- Children: Johan Axel Gustaf Acke; Nils Elias Anckers; Sigrid Rissler

Nils Johan Andersson (20 February 1821 Gärdserum, Småland, Sweden – 27 March 1880 Stockholm), was a Swedish botanist and traveller. The standard author abbreviation Andersson is used to indicate this person as the author when citing a botanical name. He studied at Uppsala University between 1840-45 obtaining a DSc. On 30 September 1851 he accompanied the Swedish expedition as botanist aboard the frigate HSwMS Eugenie, sailing from Karlskrona under the command of Captain Christian Adolf Virgin (1797-1870), on the first Swedish circumnavigation, calling at Honolulu, Tahiti, San Francisco, Sydney and Manila, various South American ports, the Galapagos, Hong Kong and Singapore. On this voyage he collected at the Cape of Good Hope in April 1853. Returning to Sweden, he was appointed Professor of Botany at Lund University. He was also director of the Botanical Department of the Swedish Museum of Natural History and the Hortus Bergianus in Stockholm. His special interests were Salix, Cyperaceae and Gramineae and he published numerous papers on the systematics and morphology of these taxa. Andersson edited two exsiccata-like works, i.e. Flora Lapponica exsiccata and Våra bästa mat-lafvar. Kortfattad anvisning att ingenkänna, insamla och till födoämne bereda några af våra allmännaste lafvar.

In 1875, acting on behalf of the Swedish Museum of Natural History, he acquired Sonder's South African collection of some 100 000 specimens.

Andersson was commemorated in the Piperaceae genus Anderssoniopiper. According to Yuncker, Trelease's student who completed Trelease's work after his death, there are grave doubts about the type locality of Anderssoniopiper panamense. (presently filed under Piper latifolium L.f.), which is not to be found anywhere in Panama. It may well have been collected in Tahiti, Honolulu or Sydney and mislabelled during or after the voyage.

He was elected a member of the Royal Swedish Academy of Sciences in 1859.

== Family ==
Andersson was married to the artist Anna Tigerhielm. Their son Johan Axel Gustaf Acke (1859-1924) was a well-known painter, sculptor and illustrator; their other son Nils Elias Anckers was a naval officer and artist. He is also the father of Sigrid Rissler (1868-1918).

== Some works ==
- Enumeratio Plantarum in Insulis Galapagensibus huiusque Observatorum - Nils Johan Andersson (1861)
- En verldsomsegling Stockholm 1853-1854, 3 vols, Leipzig 1854
- Salices Lapponiæ Uppsala 1845
- Conspectus vegetationis Lapponiae ca. 1846
- Atlas öfver Skandinaviska florans naturliqa familjer 1849
- Cyperaceae Scandinaviae Stockholm 1849
- Gramineae Scandinavae Stockholm 1852
- Om Galapagos-Öernas Vegetation Stockholm 1854
- Inledning till Botaniken Stockholm 1851-53, 3 tomos
- Väggtaflor för åskådnings-undervisningen i Botanik 1861 - 1862

== See also ==
- European and American voyages of scientific exploration

== Bibliography ==
- Skogman, Carl Johan Alfred - "Fregatten Eugenies Resa Omkring Jorden"... Stockholm, Adolf Bonnier, 1854
