= Bids for the 2004 Summer Olympics =

Bids for the 2004 Summer Olympics and Paralympics
Overview
- Games of the XXVIII Olympiad; XII Paralympic Games
- Winner: Athens; Runner-up: Rome; Shortlist: Cape Town · Stockholm · Buenos Aires

Details
- Committee: IOC
- Election venue: Lausanne; 106th IOC Session

Map of the bidding cities

Important dates
- Decision: September 5, 1997

Decision
- Winner: Athens (66 votes)
- Runner-up: Rome (41 votes)

Five cities made the shortlist with their bids to host the 2004 Summer Olympics (formally known as Games of the XXVIII Olympiad), which were awarded to Athens, on September 5, 1997. The other shortlisted cities were Rome, Cape Town, Stockholm and Buenos Aires. The other applicant cities were Rio de Janeiro, San Juan, Istanbul, Lille, Saint Petersburg and Seville.

== Bidding process ==
In Chapter 5, Rule 34 of the official rulebook, the bidding process begins when an aspiring city submits a bid to the International Olympic Committee (IOC) by their own National Olympic Committee (NOC). The IOC then presents their pick after a session.

From 1999, the process had two phases. The first phase contains a questionnaire that aspiring cities have to answer, surrounding themes like their capabilities, strengths, and more information, which is used to decide the best city. The files are then examined by the IOC Evaluation Commission, with athletes, representatives, the International Paralympic Committee, and more. Commission members then make a four-day inspection visit to the respective cities, helping the committee determine the winning city through a report.

The IOC session, which helps furthermore determine the winning city, is placed in a non-bidding city. The election is made by the current IOC members, which all have a single vote. Residents of respective bidding countries couldn't vote until their country is eliminated and another round begins. In case of a tie, another vote is commenced, until a respective country is eliminated. The rest of the countries are then introduced to the next round. After the IOC announces the host city, the delegation of the host city needs to sign an agreement named the "Host City Contract", created by the IOC, which contains the responsibility of the Games organization to the city and the NOC.

== Final selection ==
In the first round of voting, Buenos Aires and Cape Town tied with the lowest number of votes. Round two was therefore a tie-breaker round between the two cities, with Buenos Aires being eliminated. Stockholm was the next city to be eliminated followed by Cape Town. The final round saw Athens receive enough votes to defeat Rome and win the right to host the 2004 Summer Olympics.

== Official voting results ==
The Colosseum, one of Rome's most famous landmarks.

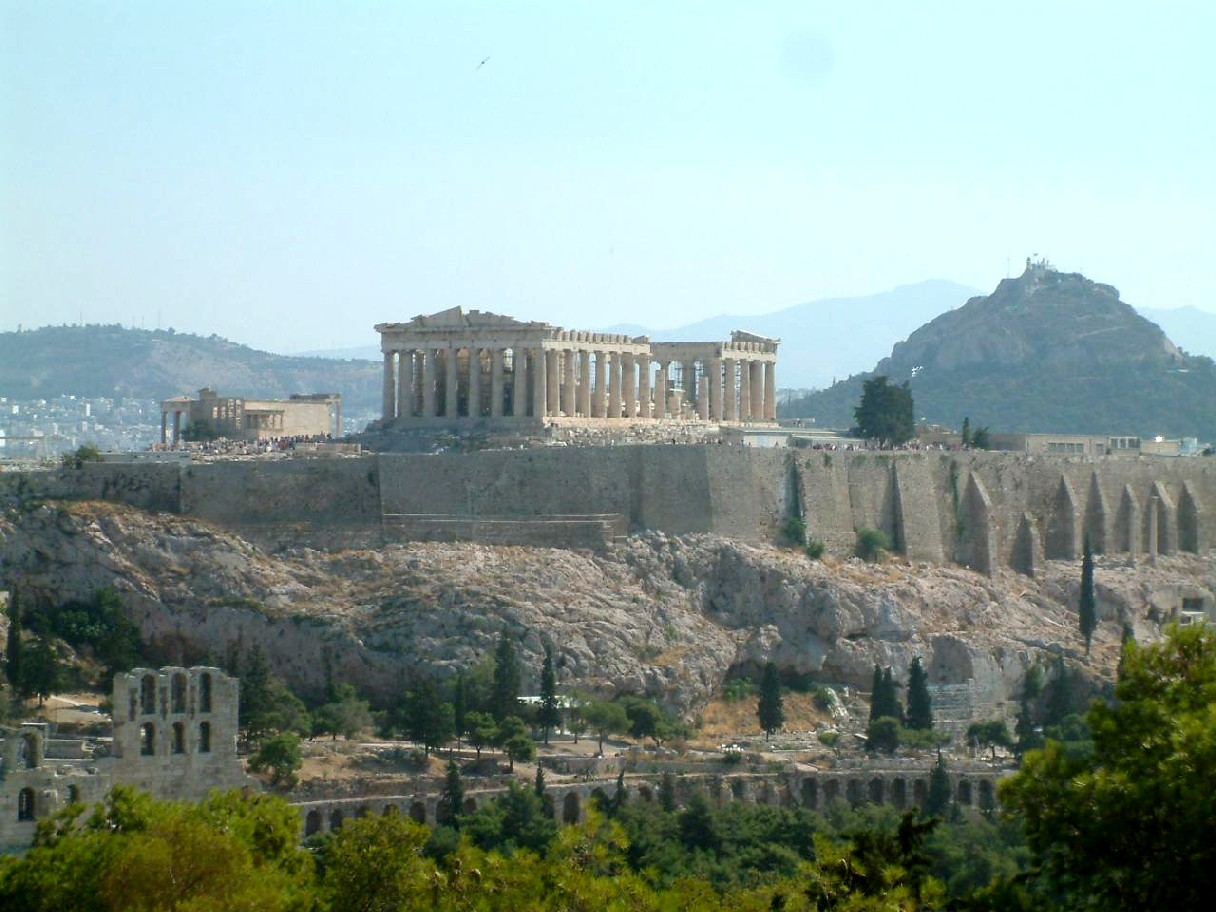
The Acropolis of Athens.

Athens was the leader in all rounds of voting, except in Round 2, which was a tie-breaker due to a first round tie between Cape Town and Buenos Aires. Cape Town won that round over Buenos Aires, before losing out in the 4th round.

2004 Host City Election — ballot results
City	Country (NOC)	Round 1	Run-off	Round 3	Round 4	Round 5
Athens	Greece	32	-	38	52	66
Rome	Italy	23	-	28	35	41
Cape Town	South Africa	16	62	22	20	-
Stockholm	Sweden	20	-	19	-	-
Buenos Aires	Argentina	16	44	-	-	-

== Bidding cities ==
=== Candidate cities ===
Logo	City	Country	National Olympic Committee	Result
	Athens	Greece	Hellenic Olympic Committee (HOC)	Winner
The city of Athens, Greece, submitted a bid for the 2004 Games and won the election in the final round of voting, defeating Rome. Athens previously hosted the first modern Olympic Games in 1896 and bid for the 1944 Summer Olympics (which were awarded to London, but cancelled due to World War II) and the 1996 Summer Olympics (which were later awarded to Atlanta). It also bid for the 1988 Summer Olympics, but its bid was not shortlisted. Athens' campaign logo is represented by a watercolor version of an Olympic cauldron, with the flame shaped as capital "A".
	Rome	Italy	Italian National Olympic Committee (CONI)	First runner-up
The capital of Italy, Rome submitted a bid for the 2004 Games and lost the election in the final round of voting, being defeated by Athens. Rome was previously awarded the 1908 Summer Olympics, but the 1906 eruption of Mount Vesuvius forced the Italians to return the Games to the IOC and passed the honors to London.Italy last hosted the 1956 Winter Olympics in Cortina D'Ampezzo. It would have been the second time Rome hosted the games, after the 1960 Summer Olympics. Rome also bid for the 1924, 1936, the cancelled 1944 Games, and was recently a candidate city for the 2024 Summer Olympics (awarded to Paris), but withdrew its bid. The city of Florence bid for the 1976 Summer Olympics, but withdrew its bid (later awarded to Montreal). Milan has also bid for the 2000 Summer Olympics but was also later withdrew (awarded to Sydney). Two years after Rome lost their 2004 bid, Turin was awarded the 2006 Winter Olympics. Milan and Cortina D'Ampezzo are scheduled to host the 2026 Winter Olympics. Rome's campaign logo depicts a stylized version of Colosseum, backgrounded by the sun.
	Cape Town	South Africa	South African Sports Confederation and Olympic Committee (SASCOC)	Second runner-up
The city of Cape Town, South Africa, submitted a bid for the 2004 Games and received the third most votes, tying with Buenos Aires in the first round of voting and winning the run-off. Cape Town never hosted the Summer Olympics or bid before. It was Africa's first bid since Alexandria, Egypt failed its bids to host the cancelled 1916 Summer Olympics and the 1936 Summer Olympics, both of which were awarded to Berlin. Had Cape Town won the rights to host the 2004 Olympic Games, it would have been the first Olympic Games in the continent of Africa. South Africa was awarded the 2010 FIFA World Cup on 15 May 2004 and Cape Town was one of the host cities. The idea of bringing the Olympic event in Africa went to its honour with Dakar, Senegal, which would host the 2026 Summer Youth Olympics. Cape Town's campaign logo consists of a stylized map of Africa colored with the colors of the Olympic rings, which is formed around the location of Cape Town, in the south of the continent.
	Stockholm	Sweden	Swedish Olympic Committee (SOK)	Third runner-up
The city of Stockholm, Sweden, submitted a bid for the 2004 Games and was eliminated in the third round of voting. Stockholm previously hosted the 1912 Summer Olympics, as well as co-hosted the 1956 Summer Olympics with Melbourne. The city had also recently bid for the 2026 Winter Olympics, with Åre as its co-host (losing to Milan and Cortina d'Ampezzo). Stockholm's campaign logo depicts the statue Man and Pegasus, located at Millesgården, just outside Stockholm. Its hopes were ruined when sports arenas in Stockholm and Gothenburg were damaged by explosive bombs and arson attacks by Mats Hinze.
	Buenos Aires	Argentina	Argentine Olympic Committee (COA)	Fourth runner-up
The city of Buenos Aires, Argentina, submitted a bid for the 2004 Games and was eliminated in a run-off against Cape Town, since both cities tied in the first round of voting. Buenos Aires never hosted the Summer Olympics, but bid for the 1936, 1956, 1968 Games to become the first South American Olympic host city. Rio de Janeiro hosted the 2016 Summer Olympics and became the first city in the continent to host the games. Buenos Aires' campaign logo displays an Andean condor with open wings in blue, recalling the Argentine national colors and its flag. Buenos Aires hosted the 125th IOC Session on September 7, 2013 and hosted the 2018 Summer Youth Olympics.

=== Applicant cities ===
- Rio de Janeiro, Brazil
- San Juan, Puerto Rico
- Istanbul, Turkey
- Lille, France
- Saint Petersburg, Russia
- Seville, Spain

== Proposed dates ==
Athens	13 - 29 August
Buenos Aires	24 September - 10 October
Cape Town	17 September - 3 October
Istanbul	16 July - 1 August
Lille	23 July - 8 August
Rio de Janeiro	16 July - 1 August
Rome	16 July - 1 August
Saint Petersburg	16 July - 1 August
San Juan	16 July - 1 August
Seville	27 August - 12 September
Stockholm	9 - 25 July
