= Stockholm Olympic Stadium =

Stadium and central venue for 1912 Olympic Games

- Stadion (The Stadium)
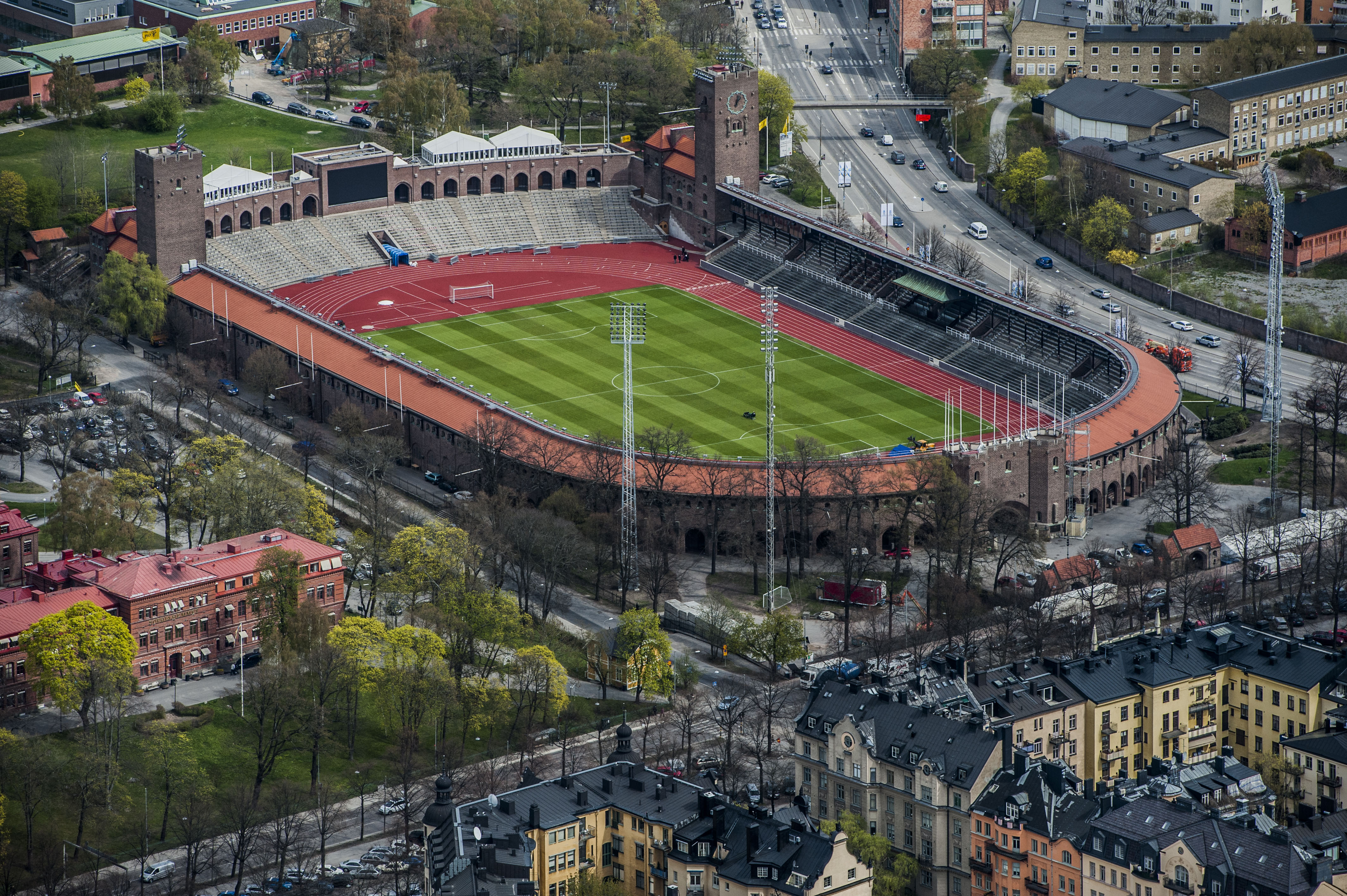
- Interactive map of Stockholm Olympic Stadium
- Full name: Stockholms Olympiastadion
- Location: Stockholm, Sweden
- Coordinates: 59°20′43″N 18°04′45″E
- Owner: Stockholm Municipality
- Capacity: 14,417 (Concerts: 33,000)
- Field size: 105 by 68 metres (344 ft × 223 ft)

Construction
- Built: 1910–1912
- Opened: 1 June 1912; 114 years ago
- Architect: Torben Grut

Tenants
- Djurgårdens IF (1936–2013); AIK (1912–1936); Djurgårdens IF (women) (2015–)

Stockholm Olympic Stadium (Swedish: Stockholms Olympiastadion), most often called Stockholms stadion or (especially locally) simply Stadion, is a stadium in Stockholm, Sweden. Designed by architect Torben Grut, it was opened in 1912; its original use was as a venue for the 1912 Olympic Games. At the 1912 Games, it hosted athletics, some equestrian and football matches, gymnastics, the running part of the modern pentathlon, tug of war, and wrestling events. It has a capacity of 13,145–14,500 depending on usage and a capacity of nearly 33,000 for concerts.

== Overview ==
The Stadium was the home ground for association football team Djurgårdens IF for many decades, until the more modern Tele2 Arena was inaugurated in 2013. Djurgårdens IF still has offices in the Stadium building.

In 1956, when Melbourne hosted the Olympics, the equestrian competitions were held here due to quarantine rules in Australia. In 1958 the stadium was the venue of the European Athletics Championships. Finland-Sweden athletics international has been held here 29 times. The annual Stockholm Marathon finishes with a three quarter lap around the tracks of the stadium. Since 1967 the stadium has been the venue of the annual international athletics meeting DN Galan, from 2011 part of Diamond League. Originally, the north-east stand had two levels, increasing the capacity to about 20,000. After the Olympics, it was reduced to one level.

The Metro station Stadion was opened in 1973.

Some sections of the stadium were damaged by a bomb attack on 8 August 1997. Mats Hinze, who was against Stockholm's bid for the 2004 Summer Olympics, was later found guilty.

== Other events ==
Since then, it has hosted numerous sports events, notably football and track and field athletics, but also for example, 50 Swedish Championship finals in bandy and hosted concerts.

In 1985, Bethany College head coach and future College Football Hall of Fame member Ted Kessinger brought the first American football team to play in Sweden. The Bethany "Terrible Swedes" defeated the Swedish all-star team 72–7.

== Motorcycle speedway ==
The stadium hosted motorcycle speedway, with the Swedish Individual Speedway Championship being held from 1948 until 1971, when the speedway surface was replaced by an athletics track. The team Getingarna also rode league speedway from 1949 to 1953.

Thirty years later in 2001 and then in 2002 and 2004, the venue hosted the Speedway Grand Prix of Sweden.

== Records ==
It is one of the smallest athletics stadiums ever used in a Summer Olympic Games.

Stockholm's stadium has seen more athletic world records broken than any other stadium in the world, with a total of 84 as of 2025.

The record attendance, for football, is 21,995 and was set on 16 August 1946, when Djurgårdens IF played AIK. The record attendance, for bandy, is 28,848 and was set in 1959.

In 1995, The Rolling Stones performed at the stadium in front of 35,200 people.

Kiss sold out the stadium, by selling all 32,500 tickets in less than 20 minutes, during their 2008 World Tour. Kiss also played two nights at this stadium during their 1996–97 reunion tour Alive/Worldwide.

Michael Jackson performed on stage twice on July 17–18, 1992, during the Dangerous World Tour. Each show had 53,000 viewers, and in total 106,000 viewers.

Bruce Springsteen has performed at the stadium no less than eight times. Twice in 1988, once 1993, twice in 1999 and again in 2009 playing three sold-out shows to approximately 100.000 people.

AC/DC performed at the stadium on 3 June 2010 in front of 32,768 people.

== Gallery ==
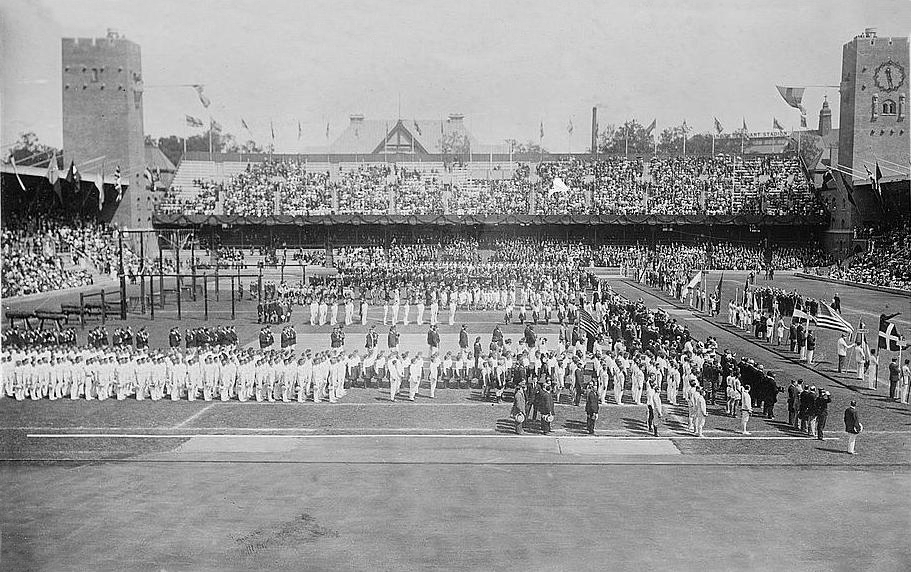
Stockholms Olympiastadion as seen from the south at the opening of the 1912 Summer Olympics. For the Games, the capacity was 20.000.

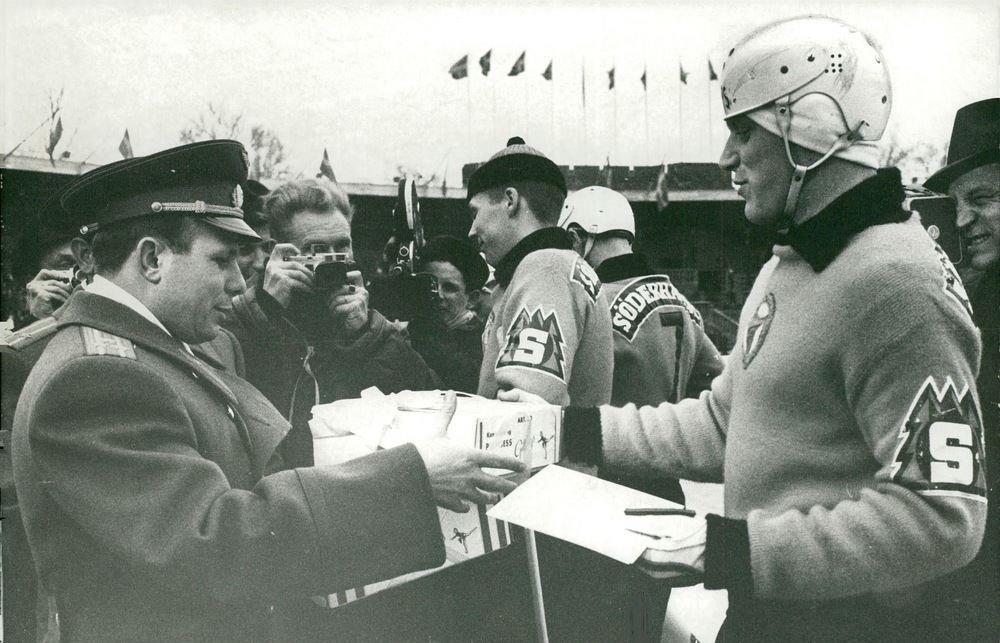
Yuri Gagarin and Göran Sedvall at the 1964 national bandy final

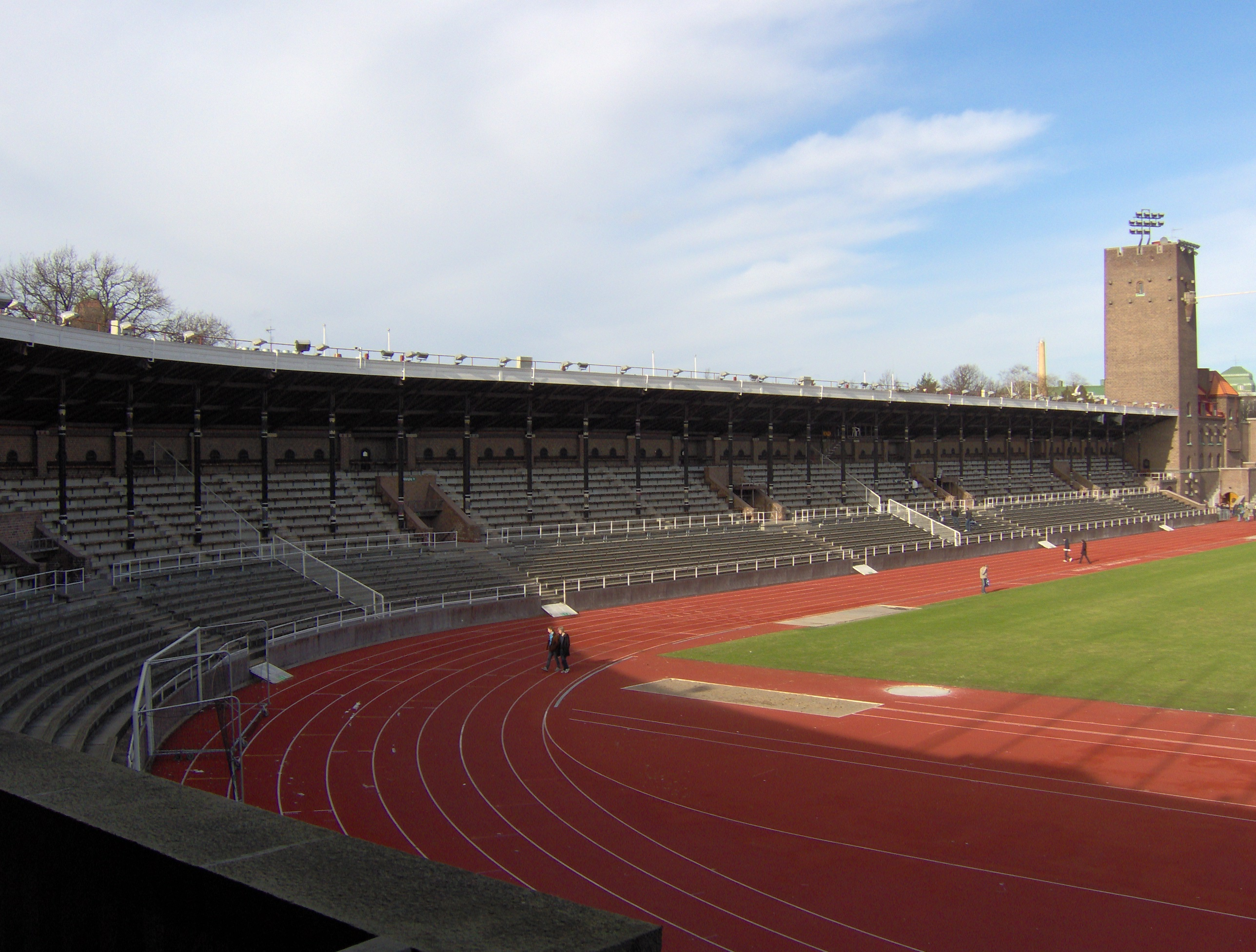
Western view of the stadium

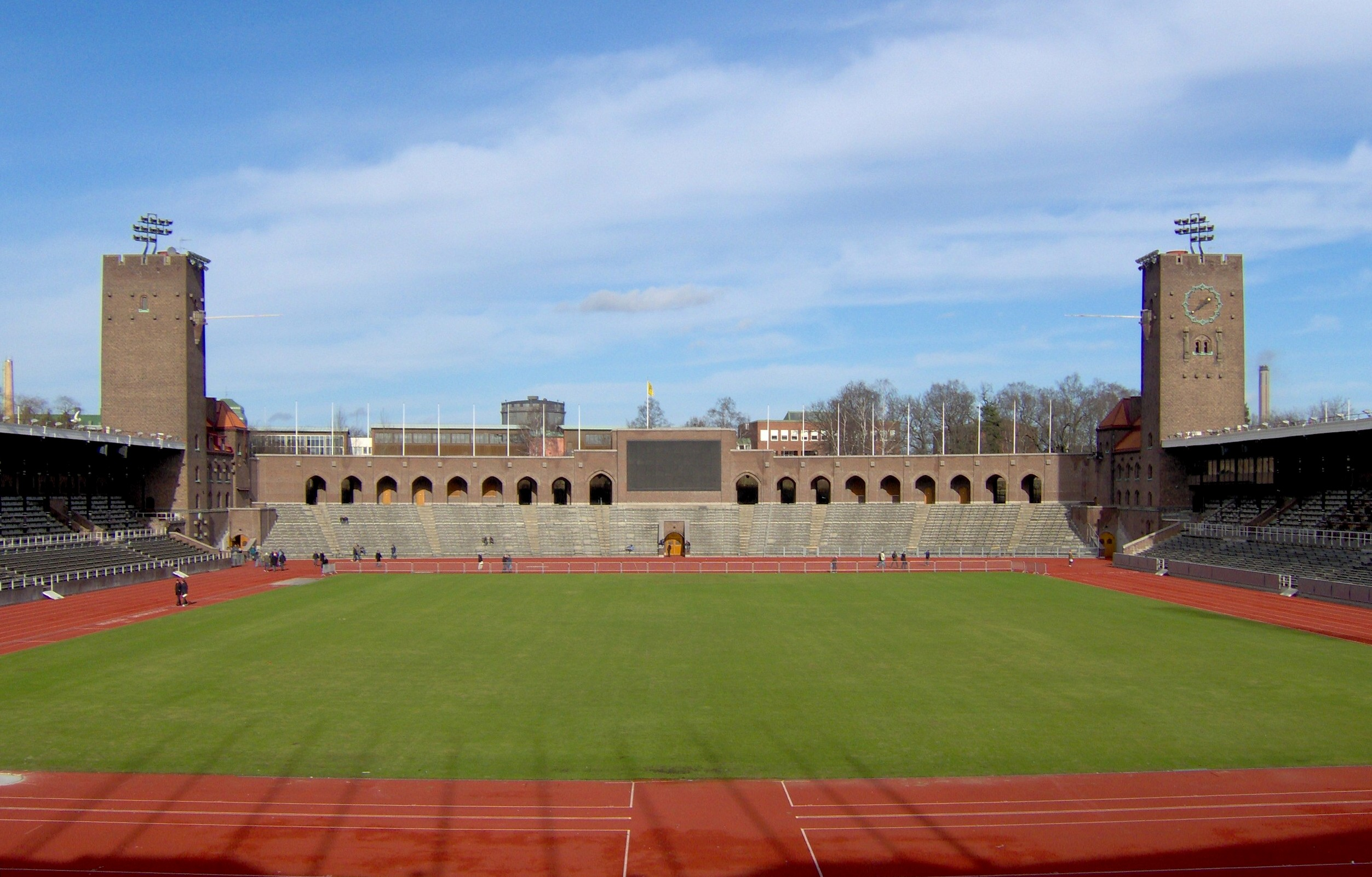
Northern view of the stadium

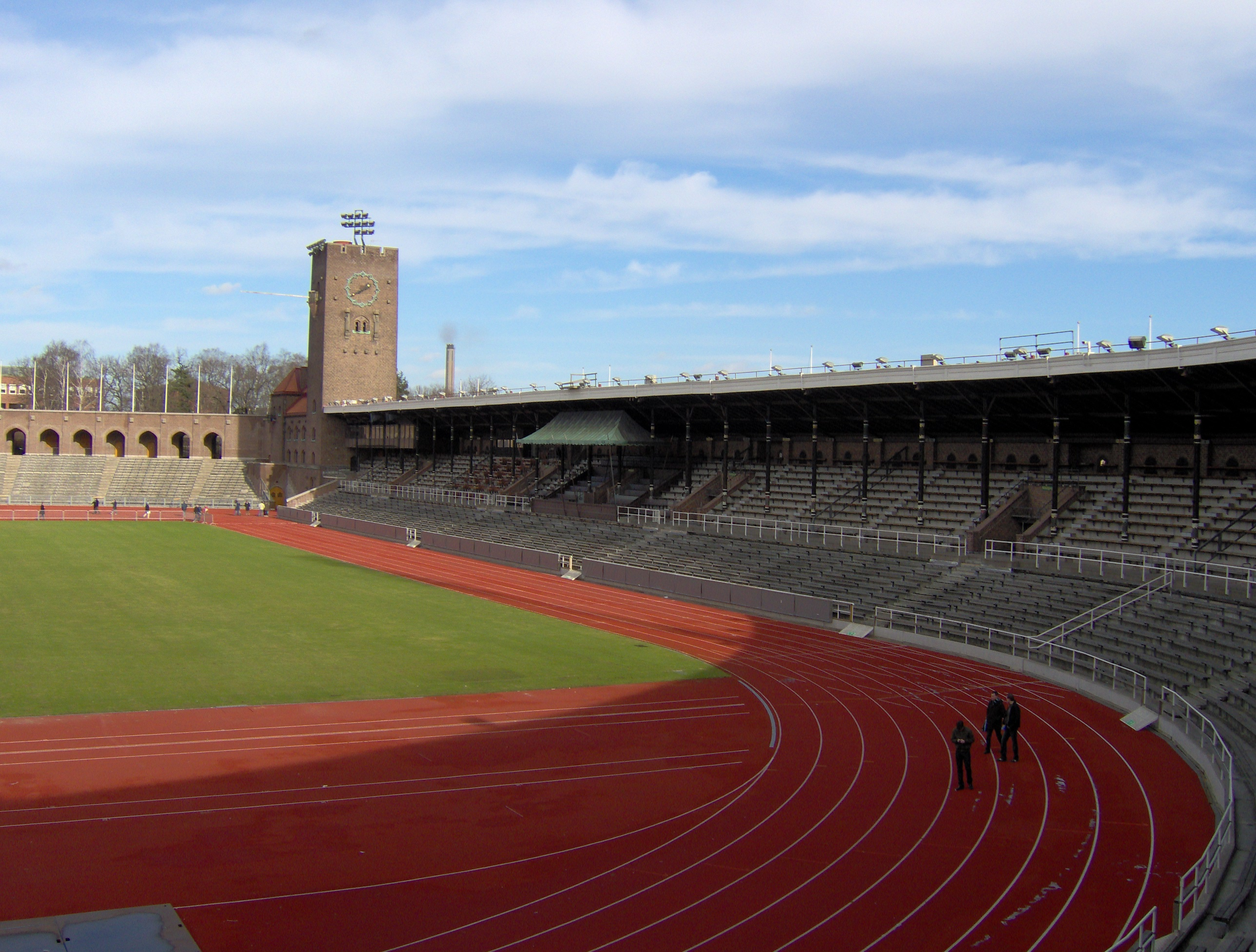
Eastern view of the stadium

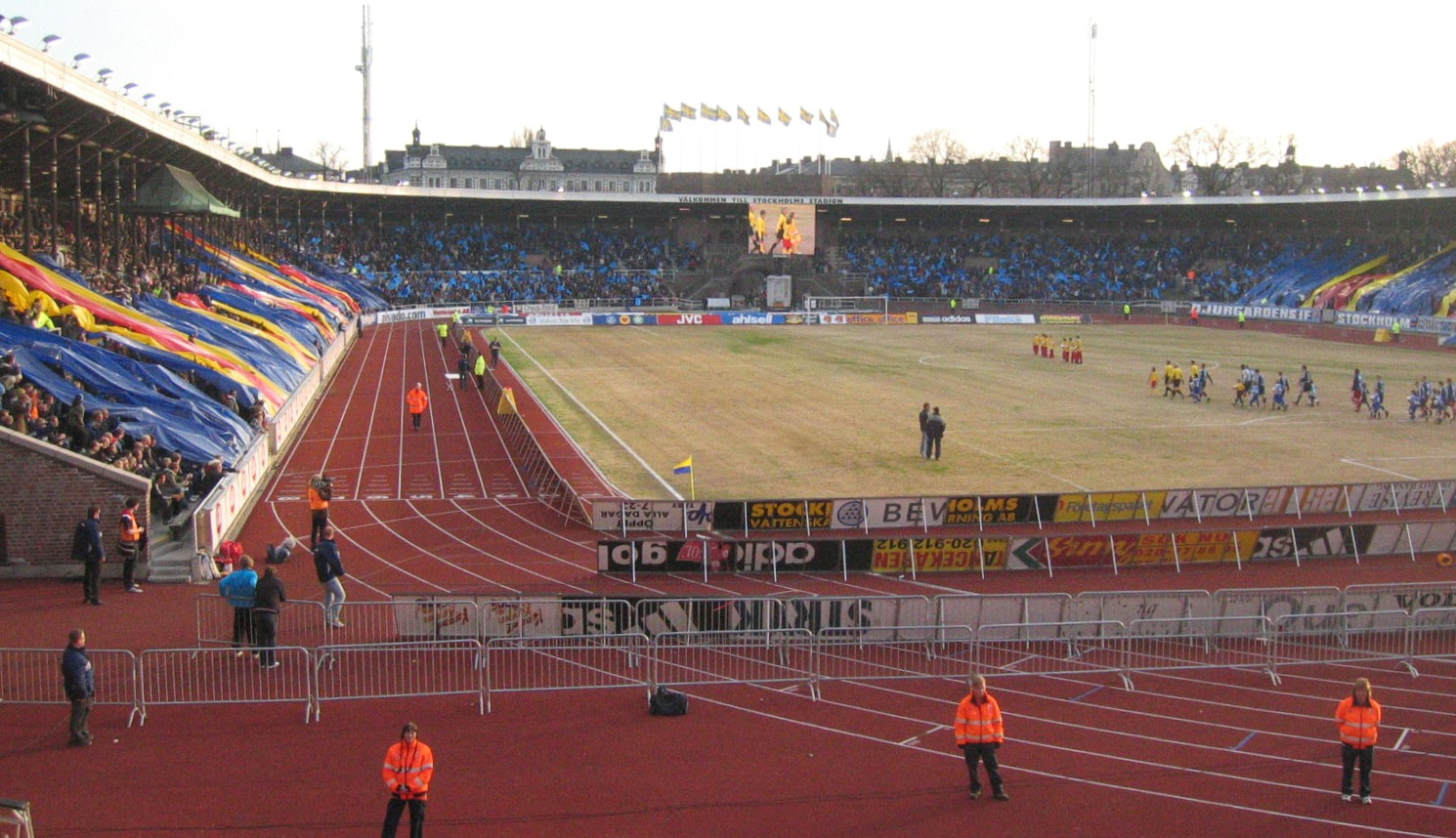
2006 Djurgårdens IF–IFK Göteborg

== See also ==
- DN Galan
- Speedway Grand Prix of Sweden

Preceded by White City Stadium; London	Summer Olympics; Main Venue (Stockholms Olympiastadion); 1912	Succeeded by Olympisch Stadion; Antwerp
Preceded by White City Stadium; London	Olympic Athletics competitions Main Venue; 1912	Succeeded by Olympisch Stadion; Antwerp
Preceded by White City Stadium; London	Summer Olympics; Football Men's Finals (Stockholms Olympiastadion); 1912	Succeeded by Olympisch Stadion; Antwerp
