= Mats Hinze =

Swedish terrorist

- Born: Mats Michael Hinze; 22 September 1970 (age 55); Täby, Sweden
- Other names: OS-bombaren (the Olympic bomber)
- Known for: Attempted bombing of Millesgården, founder of Docklands

Mats Michael Hinze (born 22 September 1970), also known as OS-bombaren (lit. 'the Olympic bomber'), is a Swedish right-wing anarchist who was caught carrying a backpack containing explosives by Millesgården in 1997.

== Political career ==
Hinze was born in Täby, Sweden and was an active member of the neo-liberal organization Frihetsfronten and was involved in the operation of the illegal club Tritnaha run by the organization. In 1995, he founded the techno club Docklands in cooperation with Anders Varveus. The club was raided several time by the police due to claims that it was part in spreading illegal narcotics. To take revenge on the Swedish authorities, Hinze planned the bombing of Millesgården. It was aimed at crippling Stockholm's attempt at hosting the 2004 Olympics. The Man and Pegasus sculpture located at Millesgården was a symbol of Sweden's attempt to host the 2004 Olympic games.

== The bomb ==
Hinze claimed that he never intended to detonate the bomb and that his goal was to humiliate the Swedish police. Hinze was also a suspect in other acts of vandalization and destruction related to the 2004 Olympics (among them the Lidingö tennishall arson). However, the police were only able to tie him to the tennis hall arson and the Millesgården incident. In 1998, the Svea Court of Appeal sentenced Hinze to seven years imprisonment for planning to bomb Millesgården as well as the tennis hall arson. He was released in 2002 and has since changed his name.

In 2004, Hinze translated the book The Adventures of Jonathan Gullible: A Free Market Odyssey to Swedish.

== Literature ==
- Lodenius, Anna-Lena (2006). Gatans parlament: om politiska våldsverkare i Sverige (in Swedish). Stockholm: Ordfront. ISBN 91-7037-275-6.
