= Olga Milles =

Austrian-born Swedish painter (1874–1967)

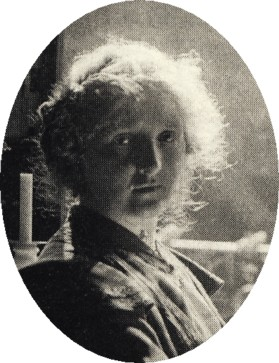
- Portrait, 1904
- Born: Olga Louise Granner; January 24, 1874
- Died: January 3, 1967 (aged 92)
- Resting place: Millesgården
- Education: Ažbe School, Munich; Académie Colarossi
- Spouse: Carl Milles (m. 1905)

Olga Louise Milles (née Granner; 24 January 1874–3 January 1967) was an Austrian-born portrait painter who spent many years at Millesgården in Sweden after marrying the sculptor Carl Milles. Although while young she was very productive, she painted less when married. After her husband was appointed professor at the Cranbrook Academy of Art in suburban Detroit, the couple spent 20 years in the United States. There she painted a number of portraits while looking after the home. Olga Milles and her husband avoided the war years in Europe, but both sympathized with Hitler and Mussolini. Two years after her husband died in 1955, she returned to Austria where she spent the rest of her life in her hometown Graz.

== Early life and education ==
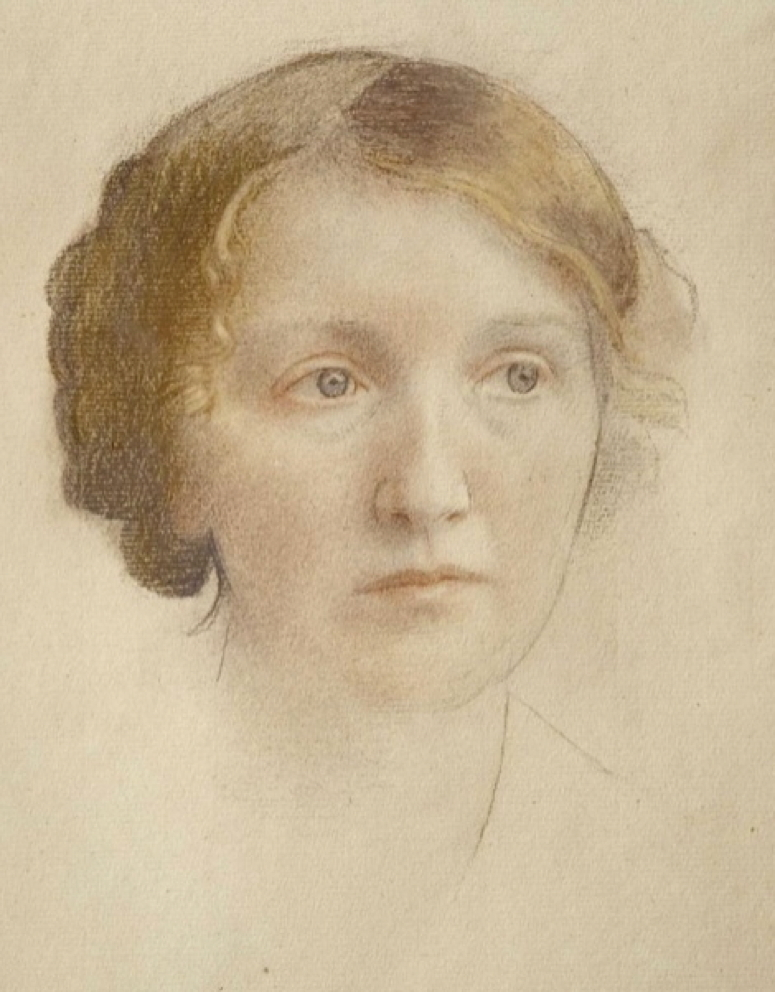
Olga Milles

Born in Graz, Austria, on 24 January 1874, Olga Louise Granner was the daughter of the accountant Anton Granner and his wife Rosalia née Kornberger. She was one of the family's four children. Thanks to her natural talent for painting, when she was 12 she was awarded a scholarship to the Landscape Art Academy (Landschaftliche Zeichenakademie) followed by three years at the Anton Ažbe's art school in Munich (1893–1895). On the earnings she subsequently received from her portraits of the Austrian aristocracy, in 1889 she was able to travel to Paris where she studied for a number of years at the Académie Colarossi.

== Career ==
Olga Granner became a competent portrait painter who was able to support herself from her work. Around 1900, she exhibited in Vienna and Munich as well as in Graz and the surroundings.

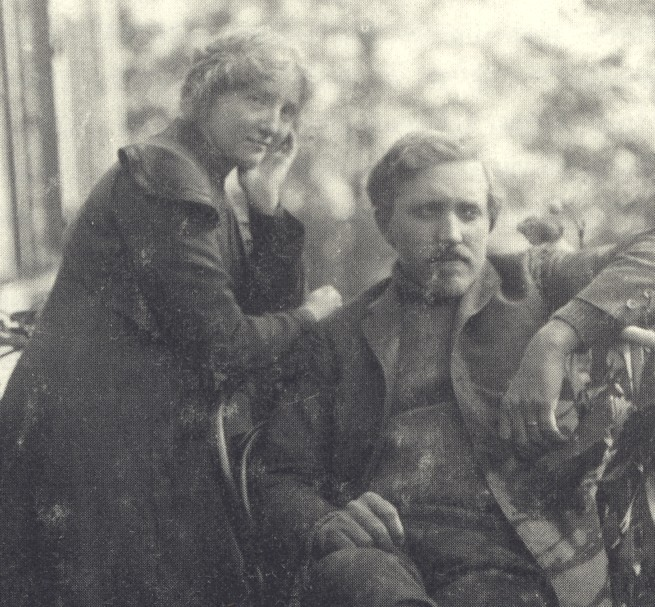
Olga Milles with her husband Carl (c. 1908)

Although she was deeply religious and had never intended to marry, as a result of Carl Milles' intensive courtship in Paris from the late 1890s, she married him in 1905. On the basis of the extensive correspondence between the two, in his biography of Carl, Erik Näslund concludes the marriage was platonic. In 1906, the couple moved to Sweden where they lived in Millesgården on the island of Lidingö which was completed for them in 1908.

In 1931, the couple moved to Detroit where Carl Milles had been appointed professor at Cranbrook Academy of Art. While there, in addition to caring for their home, Olga painted portraits. Few examples of her work remain today, possibly because she was self-critical and destroyed many of her own paintings. Although the couple managed to avoid the Second World War by living in America, both were sympathetic to Hitler and Mussolini.

The couple returned to Sweden in 1951. After her husband's death in 1955, Olga Milles returned to her native Graz where she died on 3 January 1967. Her ashes were buried in the small chapel at Millesgården, where she rests side-by-side with her husband.
