= Millesgården =

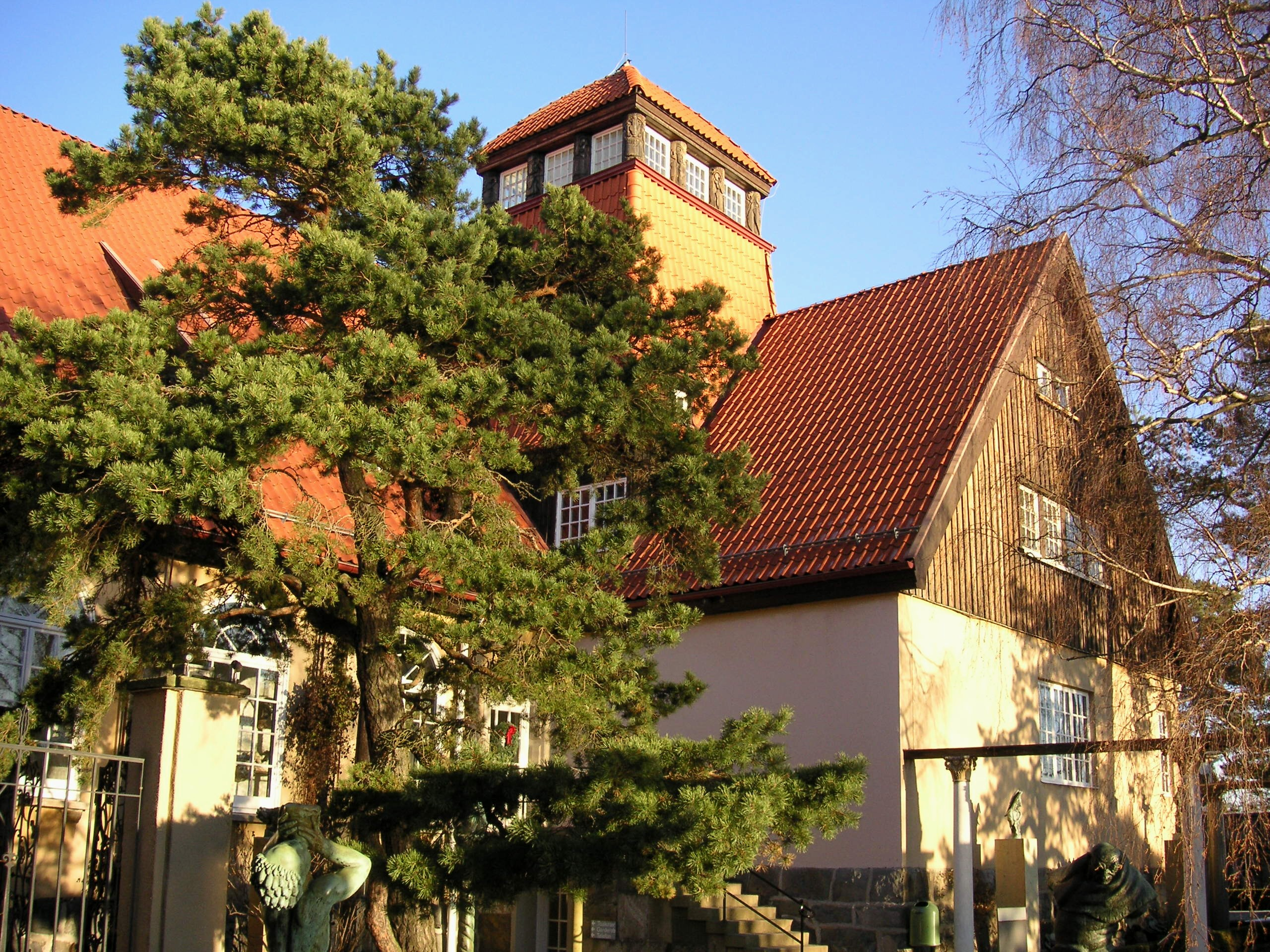
- Millesgården Main Building
- Established: 1936
- Location: Lidingö, Stockholm, Sweden
- Coordinates: 59.358889°N 18.121389°E
- Type: Art museum, sculpture garden
- Director: Onita Wass
- Curator: Tomas Järliden
- Website: www.millesgarden.se

Millesgården is an art museum and sculpture garden, located on the island of Lidingö in Stockholm, Sweden. It is located in the grounds of the former home of sculptor Carl Milles (1875–1955) and his wife, the artist Olga Milles (1874–1967). Millesgården consists of three main parts: the artists' former home, an art gallery, and a sculpture park.

== History ==
In 1906, the artist couple Carl and Olga Milles bought a plot on Lidingö. The house was designed by architect Karl M. Bengtson (1878–1935) and inaugurated in 1908. Later renovations and extensions were done in collaboration with Milles's brother architect Evert Milles (1885–1960). They planned to build a home associated with art. At Millesgården the works are mainly by Carl Milles. At the entrance of the middle terrace is a sculpture garden and another sculpture workshop, Lilla Ateljén. This was the primary residence of Carl and Olga Milles until 1931. In 1936, Millesgården was transformed into a foundation which was handed over as a gift to the Swedish people.

The Woodland Chapel was added in the late 1940s and is the site of burial for Carl and Olga Milles. In the early 1950s, Anne's House was built after drawings by Evert Milles. The house was planned for Milles's secretary, Anne Hedmark (1899–1993), who in 1950 took up the post of Millesgarden's hostess and curator. She lived there until 1986.

The newest building on Millesgården is Millesgården Art Hall, which is located along one side of the lower terrace. The Millesgården Art Hall was designed by architect Johan Celsing and was inaugurated in October 1999.

== Millesgården in popular culture ==
Millesgården is the setting of the opening scene of Poul Anderson's 1970 science fiction novel Tau Zero, and several of the sculpture garden's works are described. It is also where the Walker Brothers' hit "The Sun Ain't Gonna Shine Anymore" was filmed.

== Gallery ==
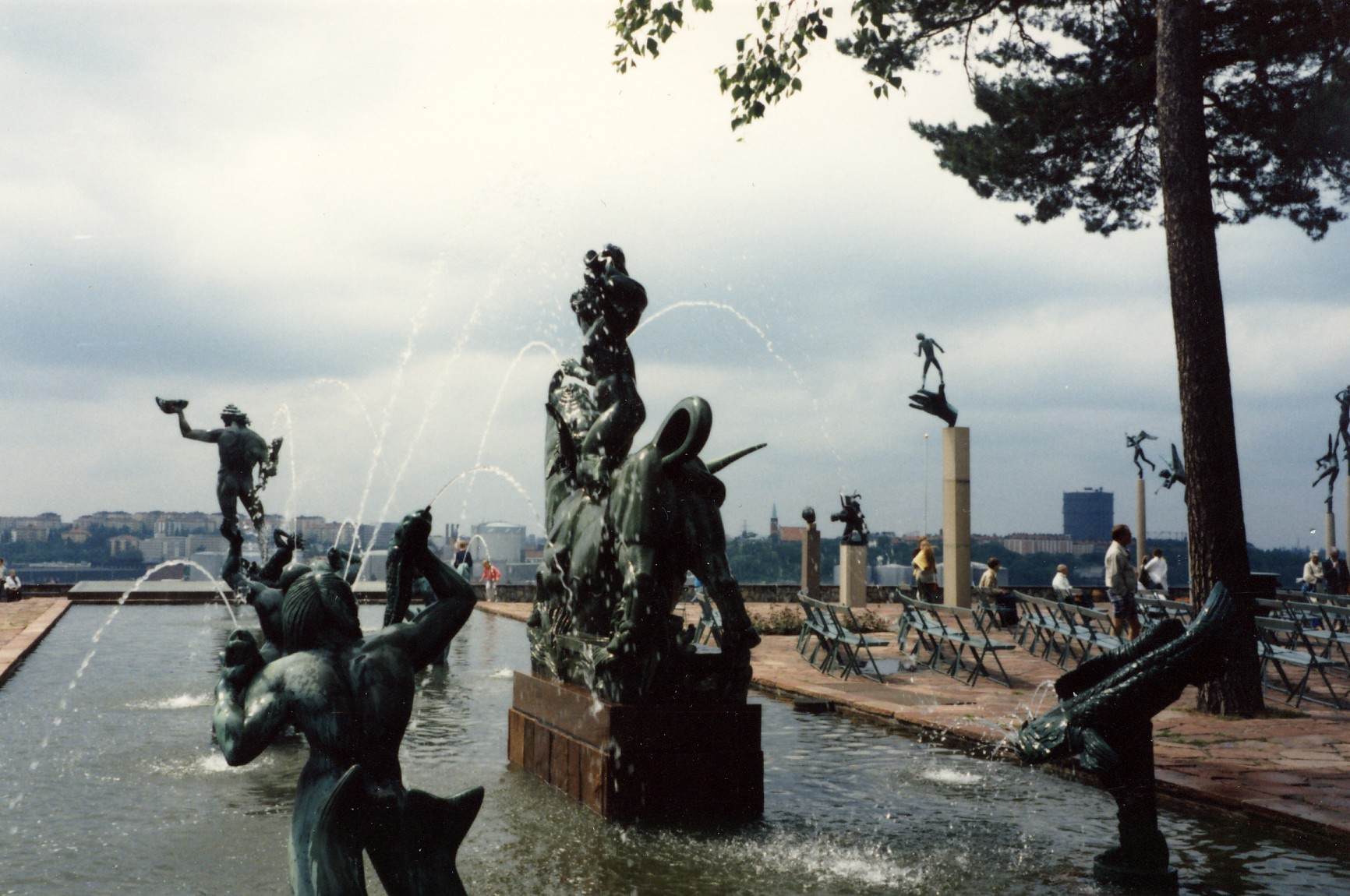
Europa and the Bull

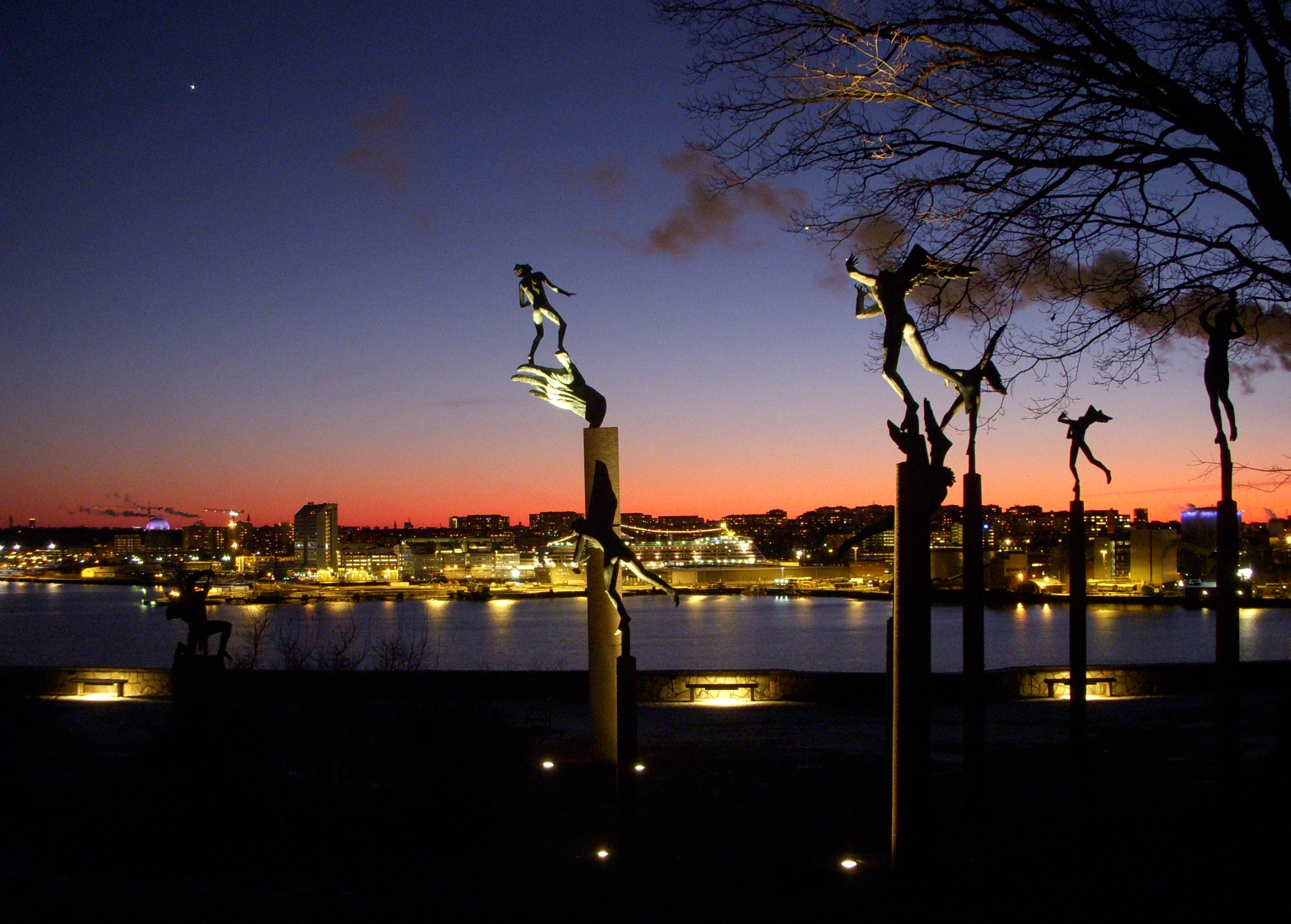
Angels playing music

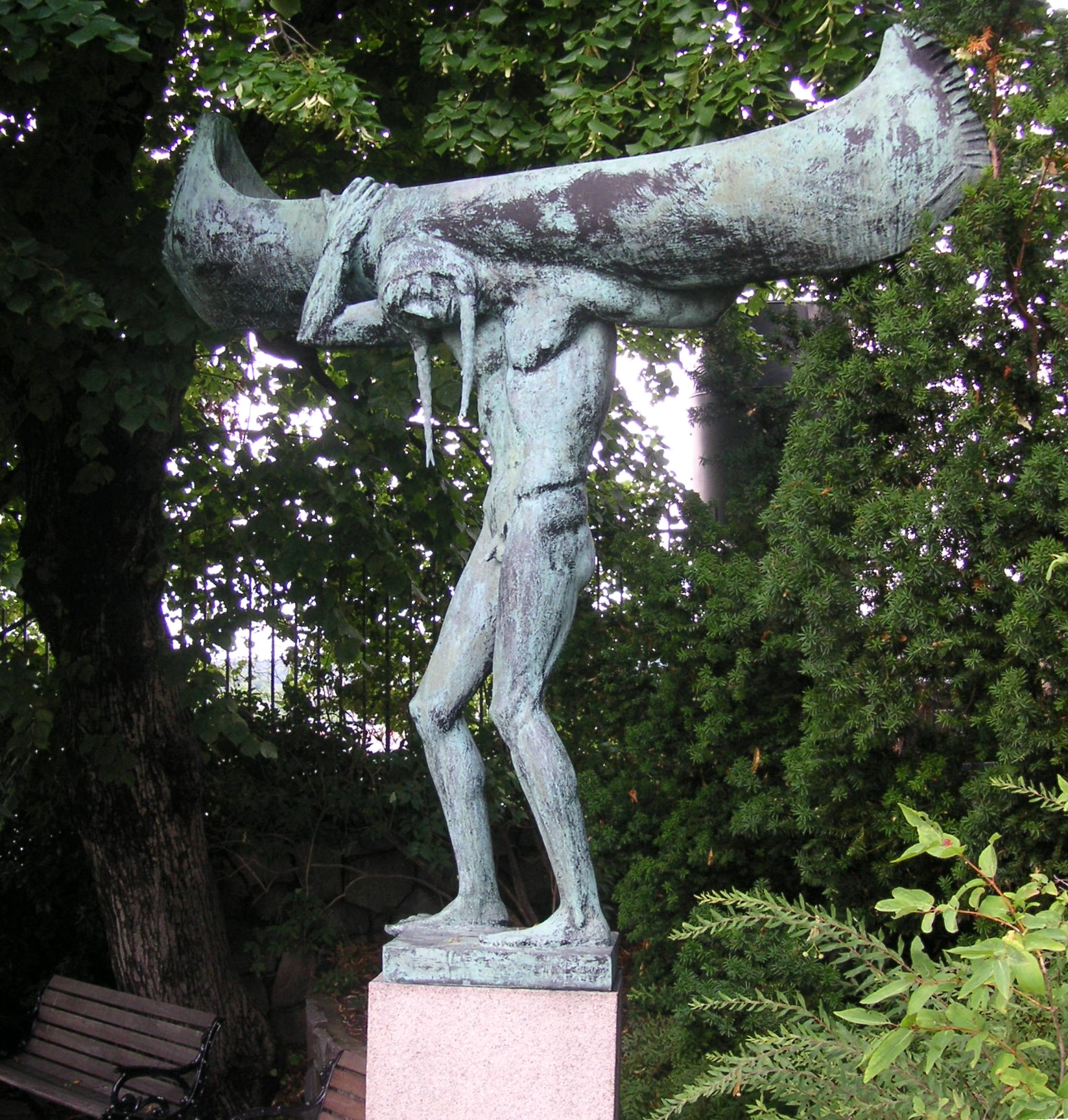
Indian with canoe

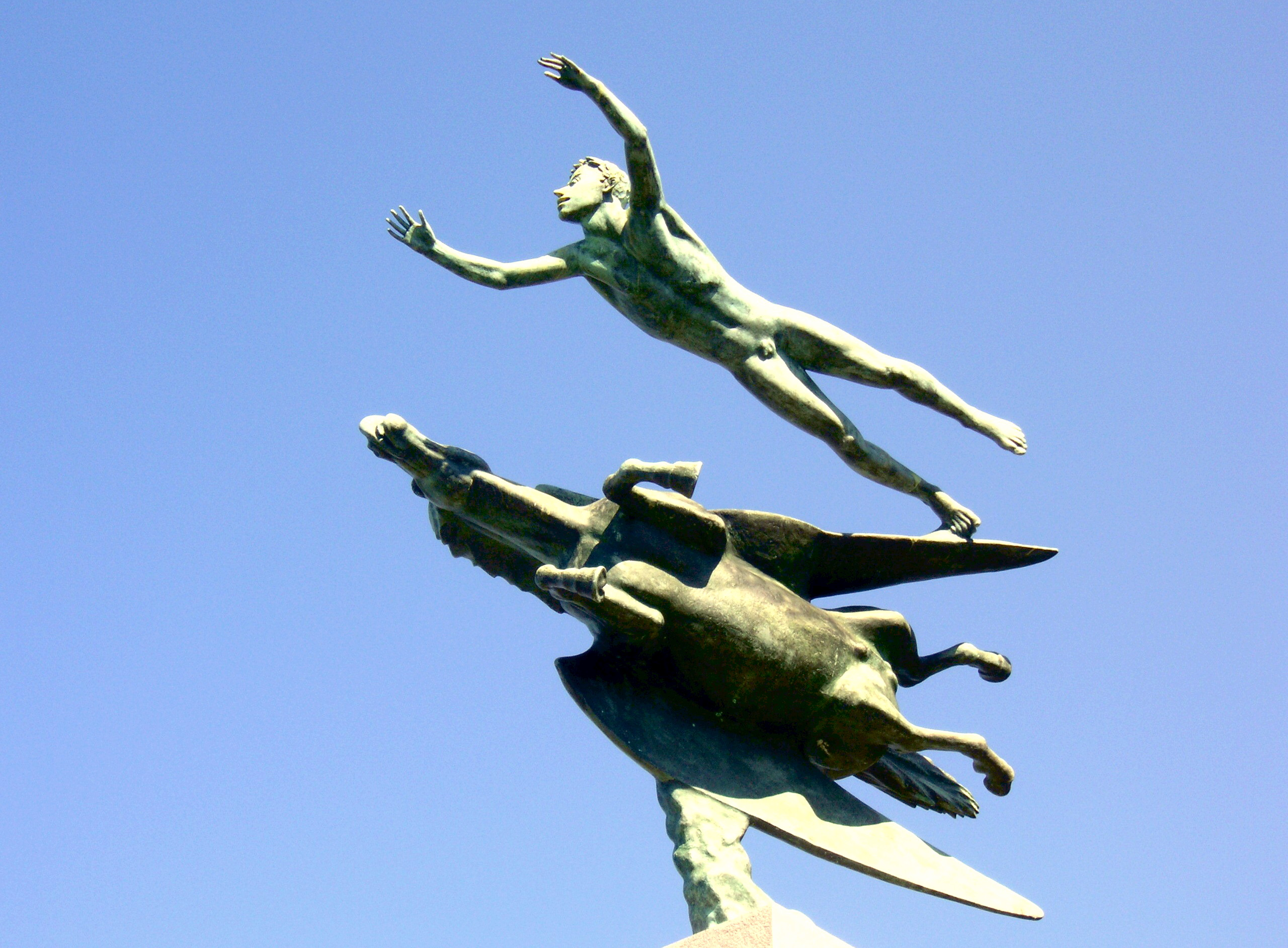
Man and Pegasus

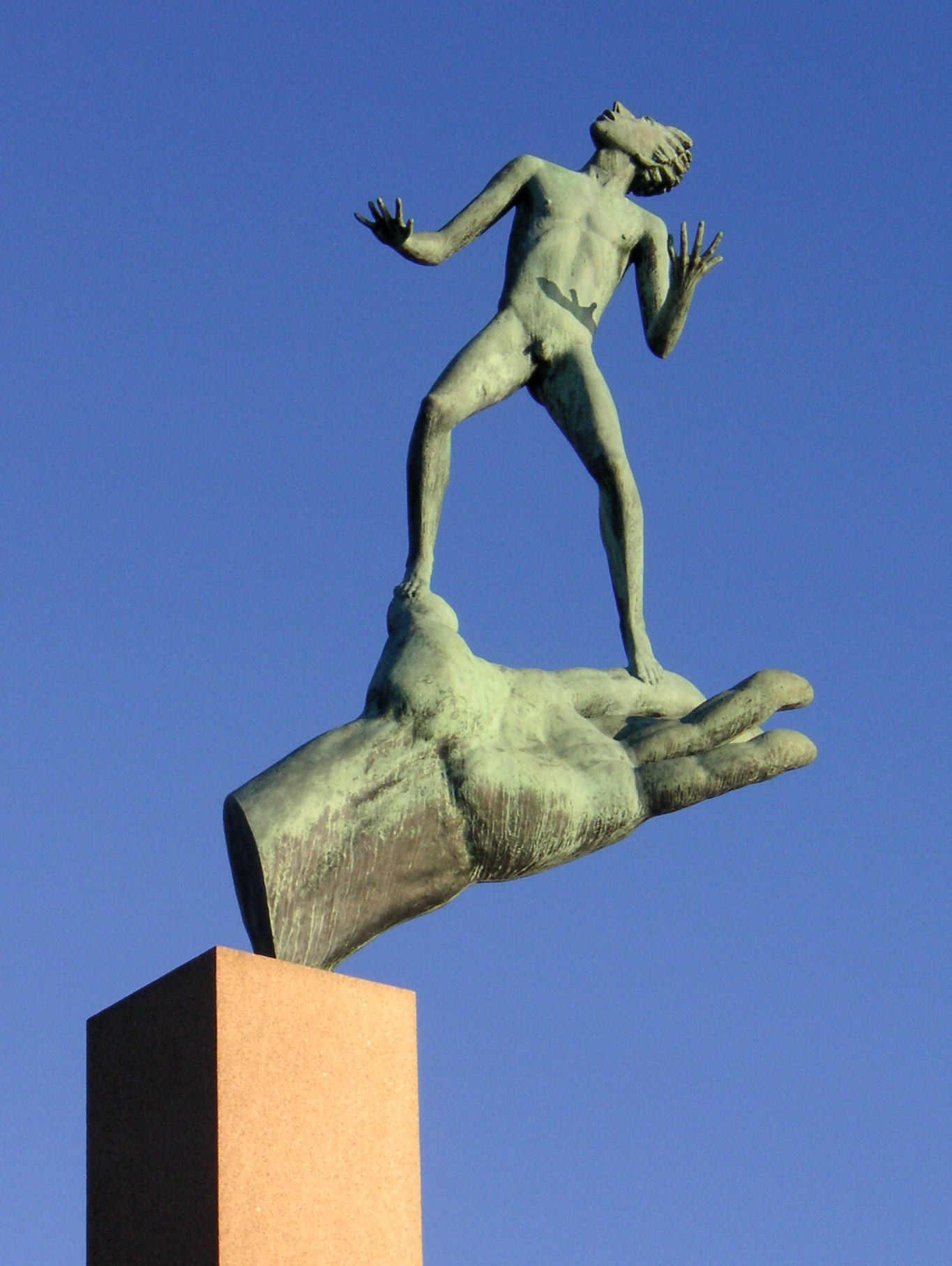
God's Hand

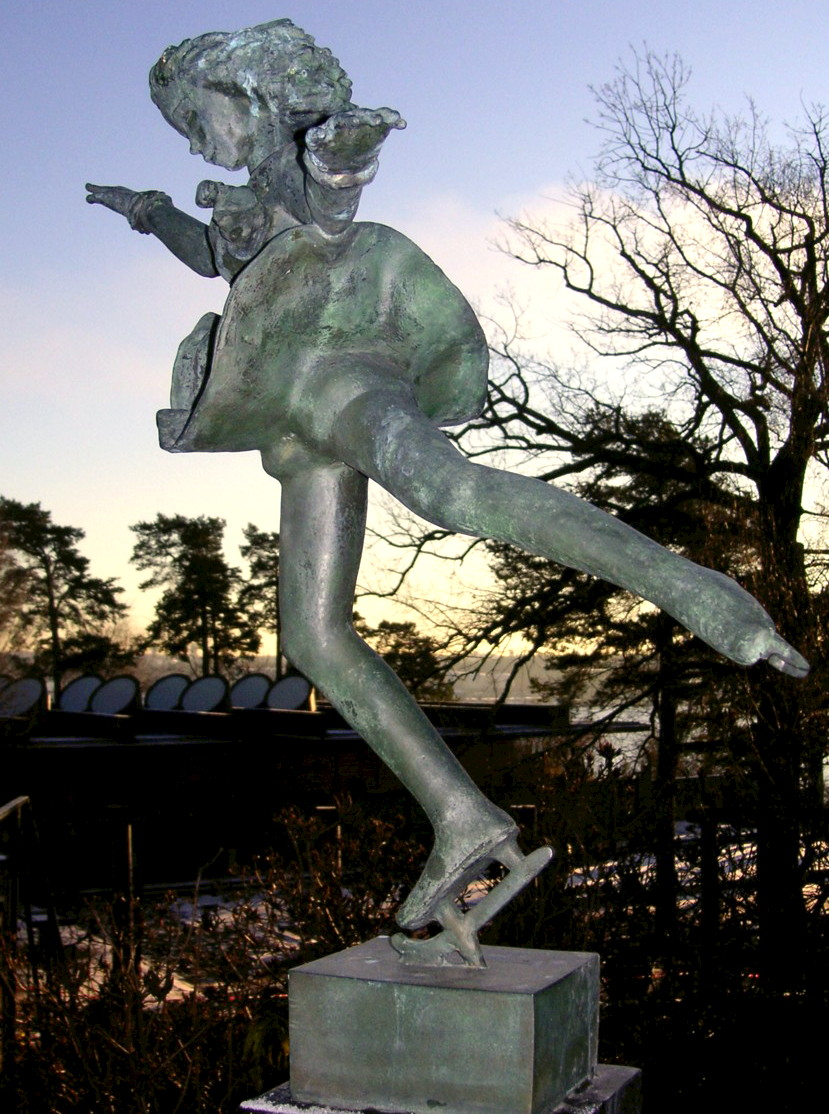
Skridskoprinsessan

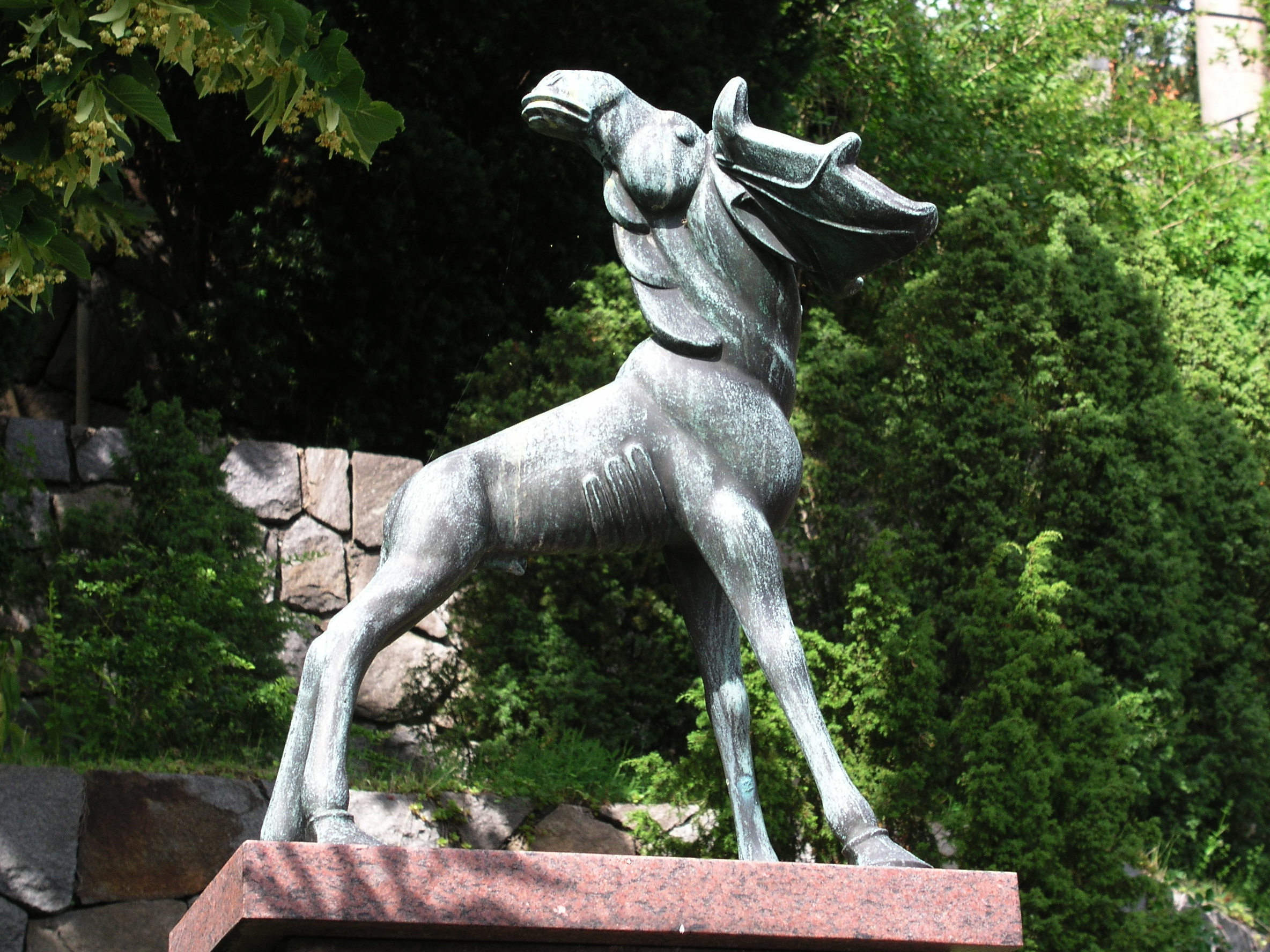
Alg

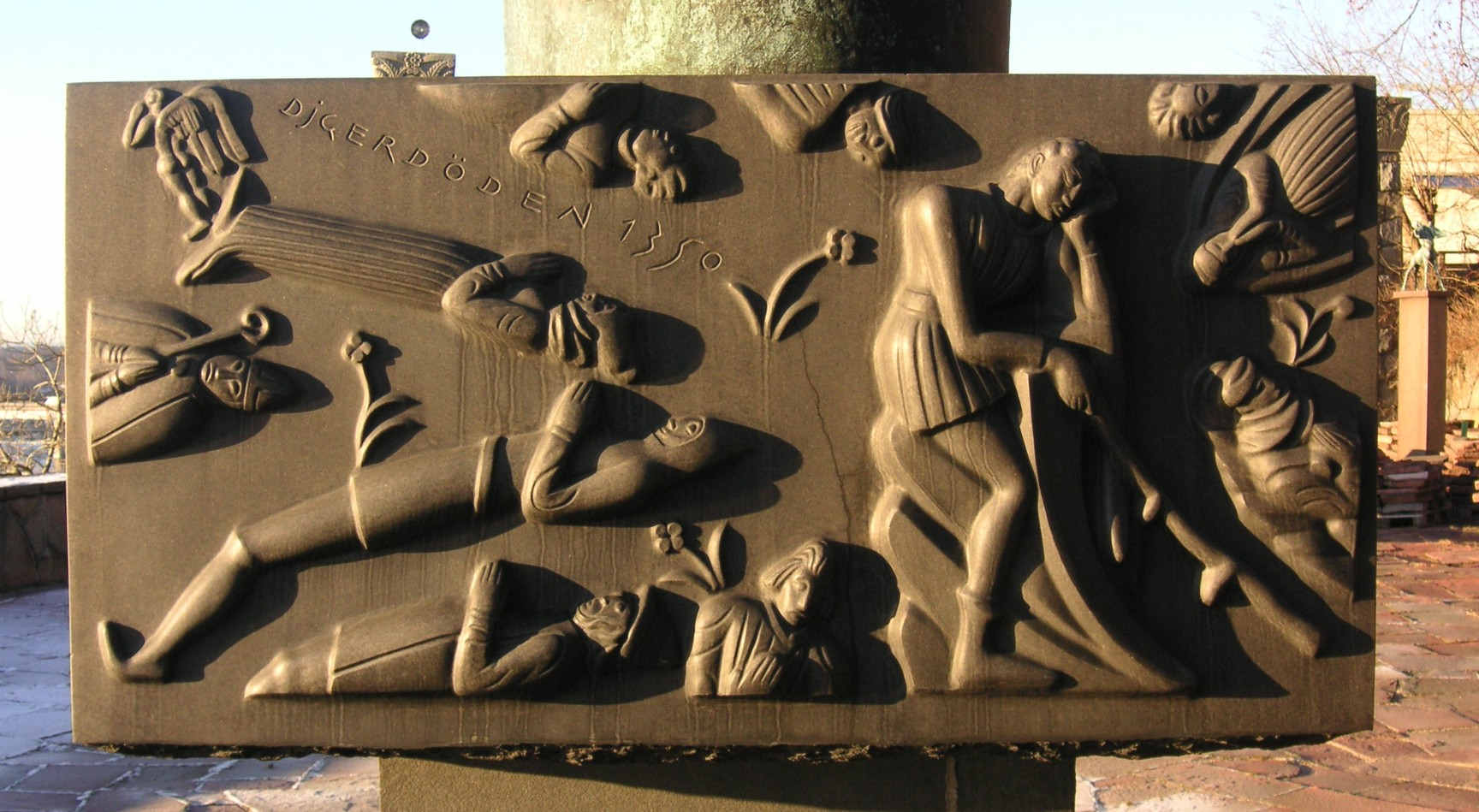
Folkungabrunnen

=== Buildings at Millesgården ===
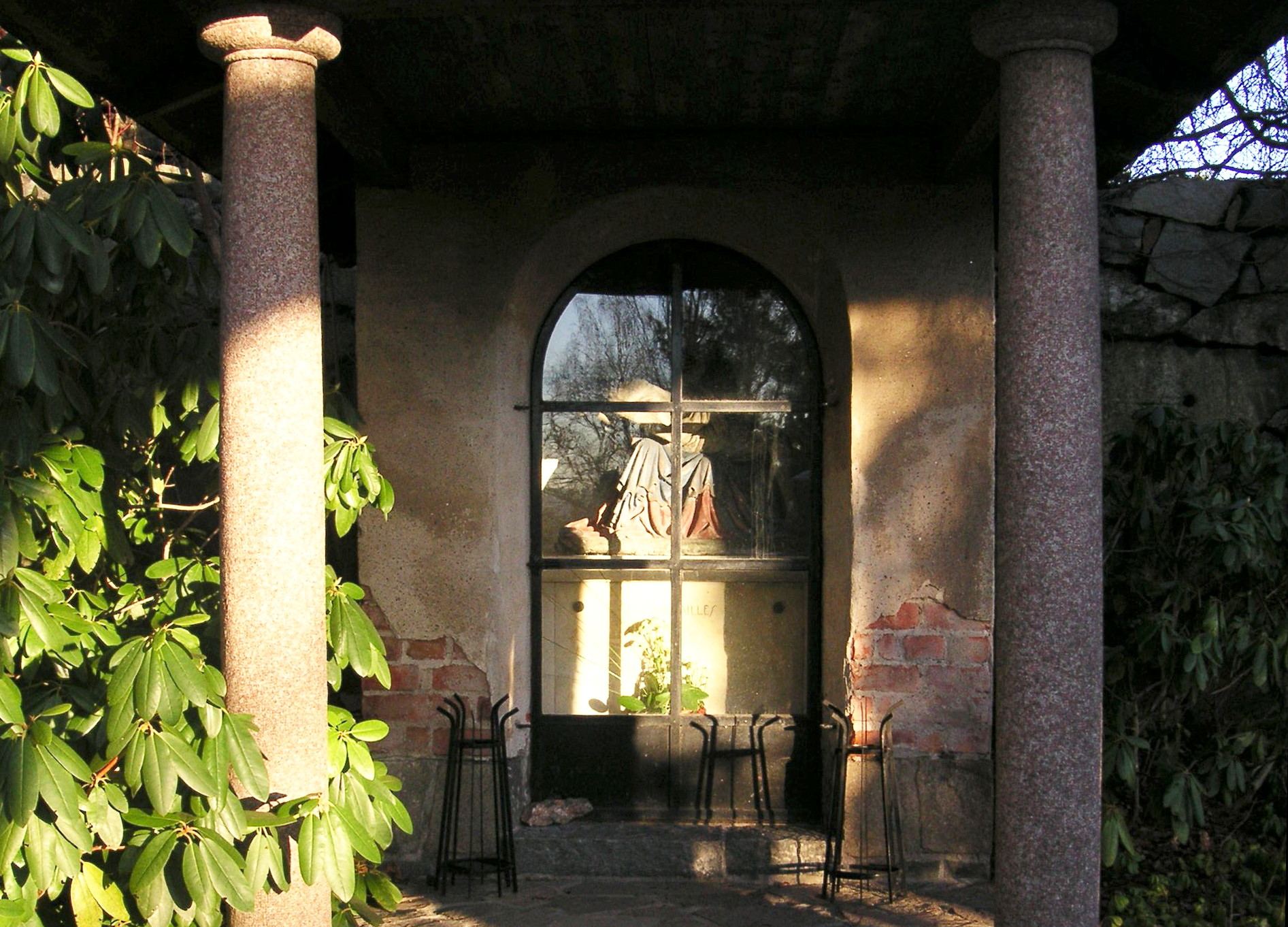
Woodland chapel

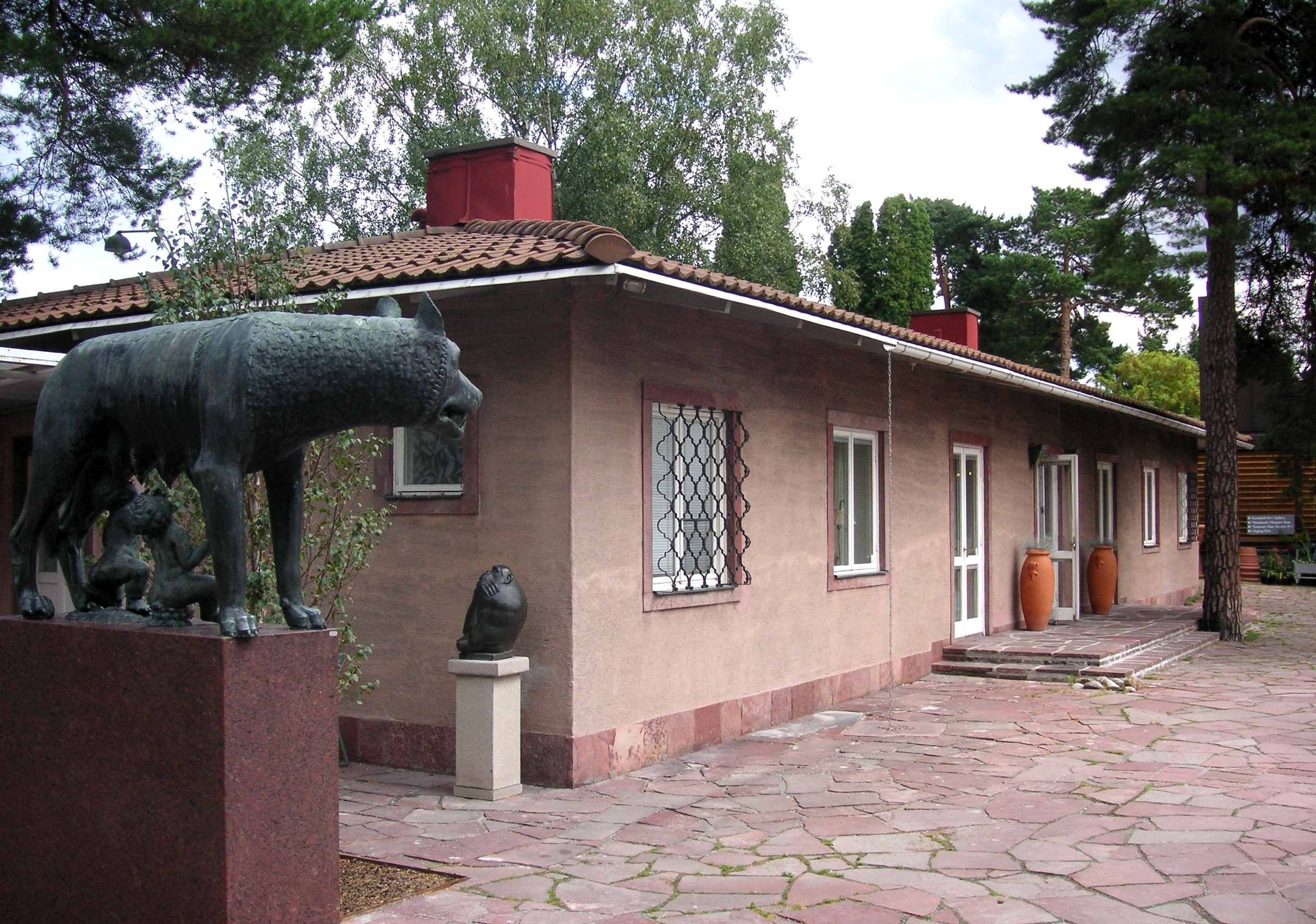
Anne's House

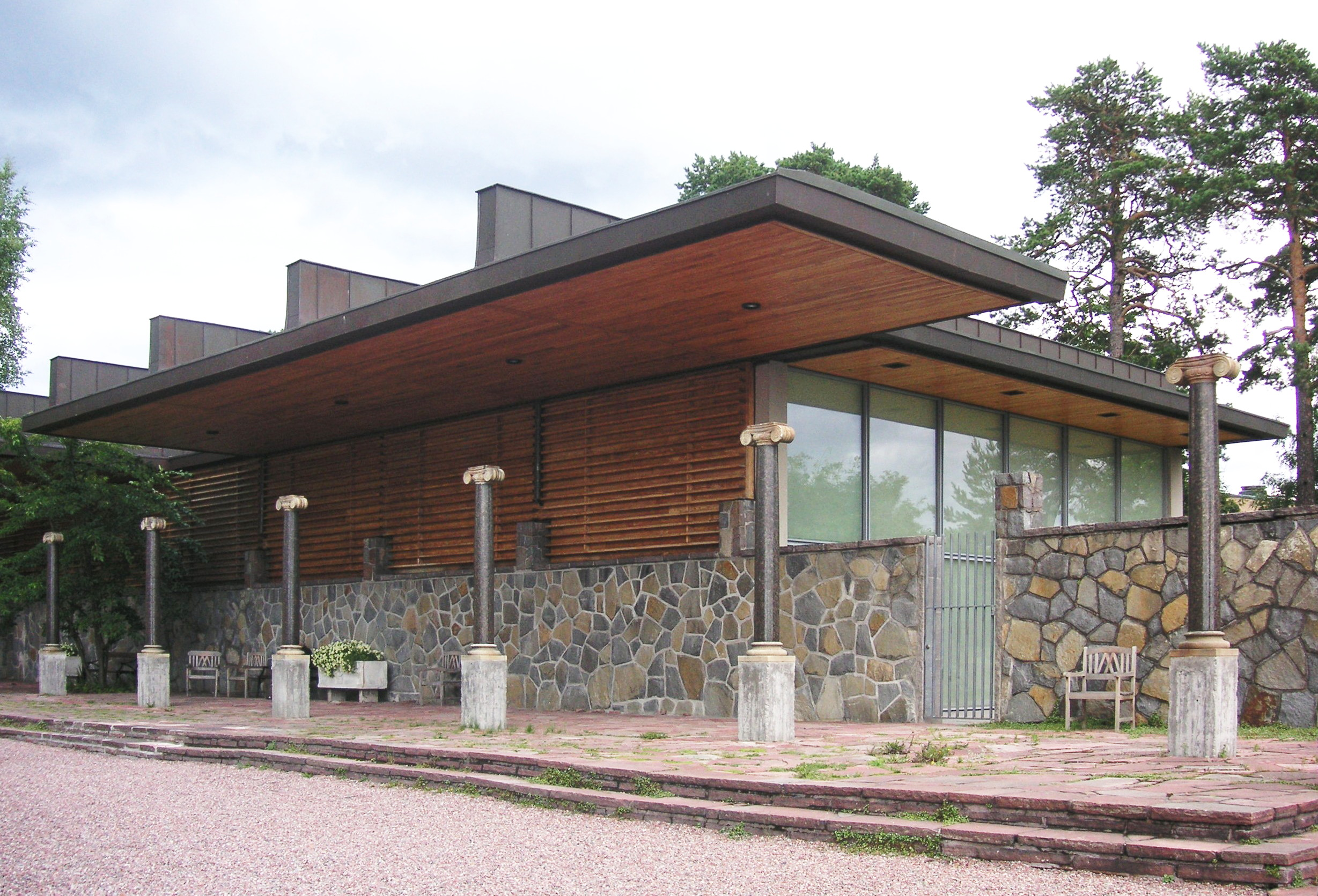
Millesgården Art Hall

=== Interior ===
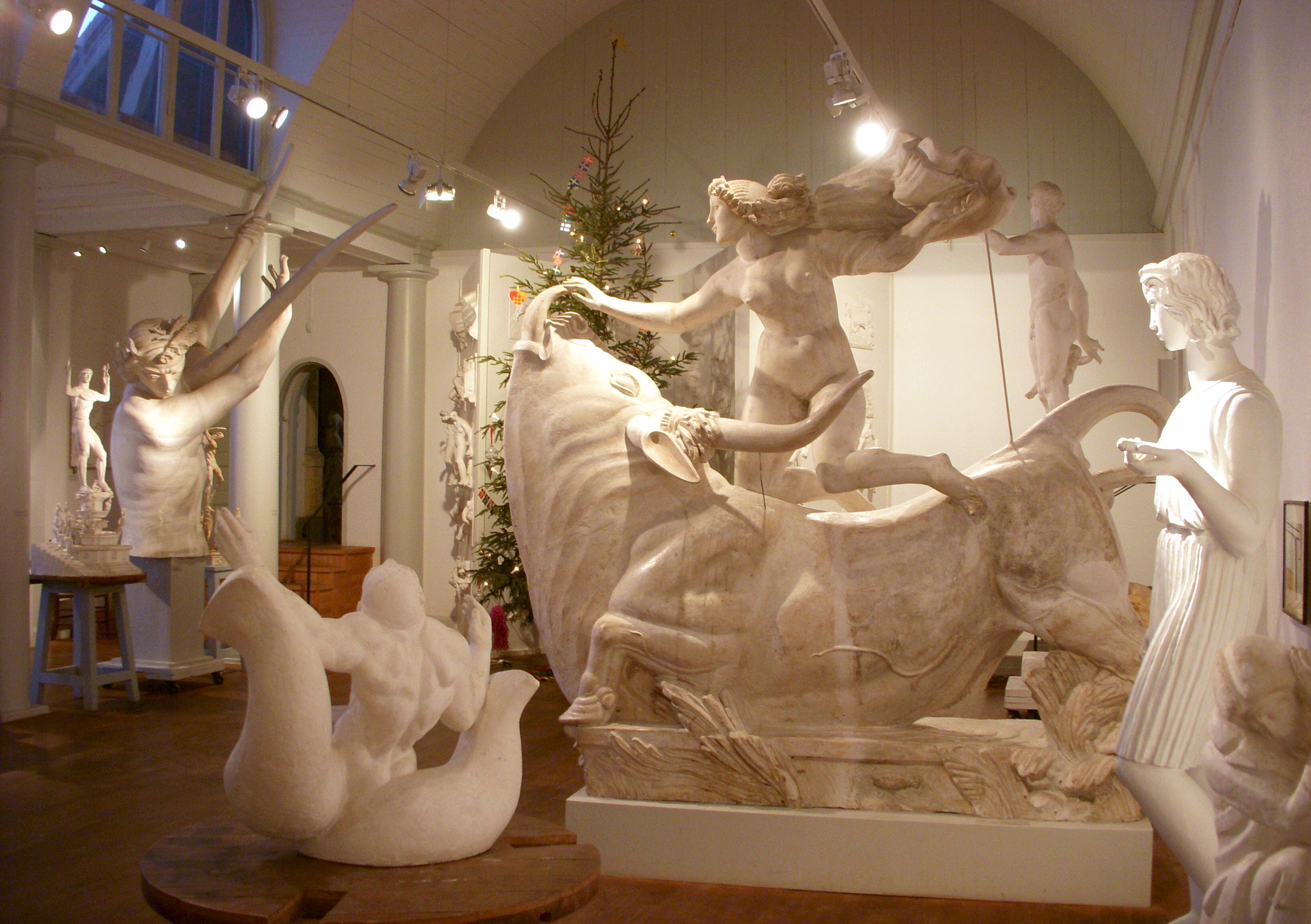
Carl Milles' studio

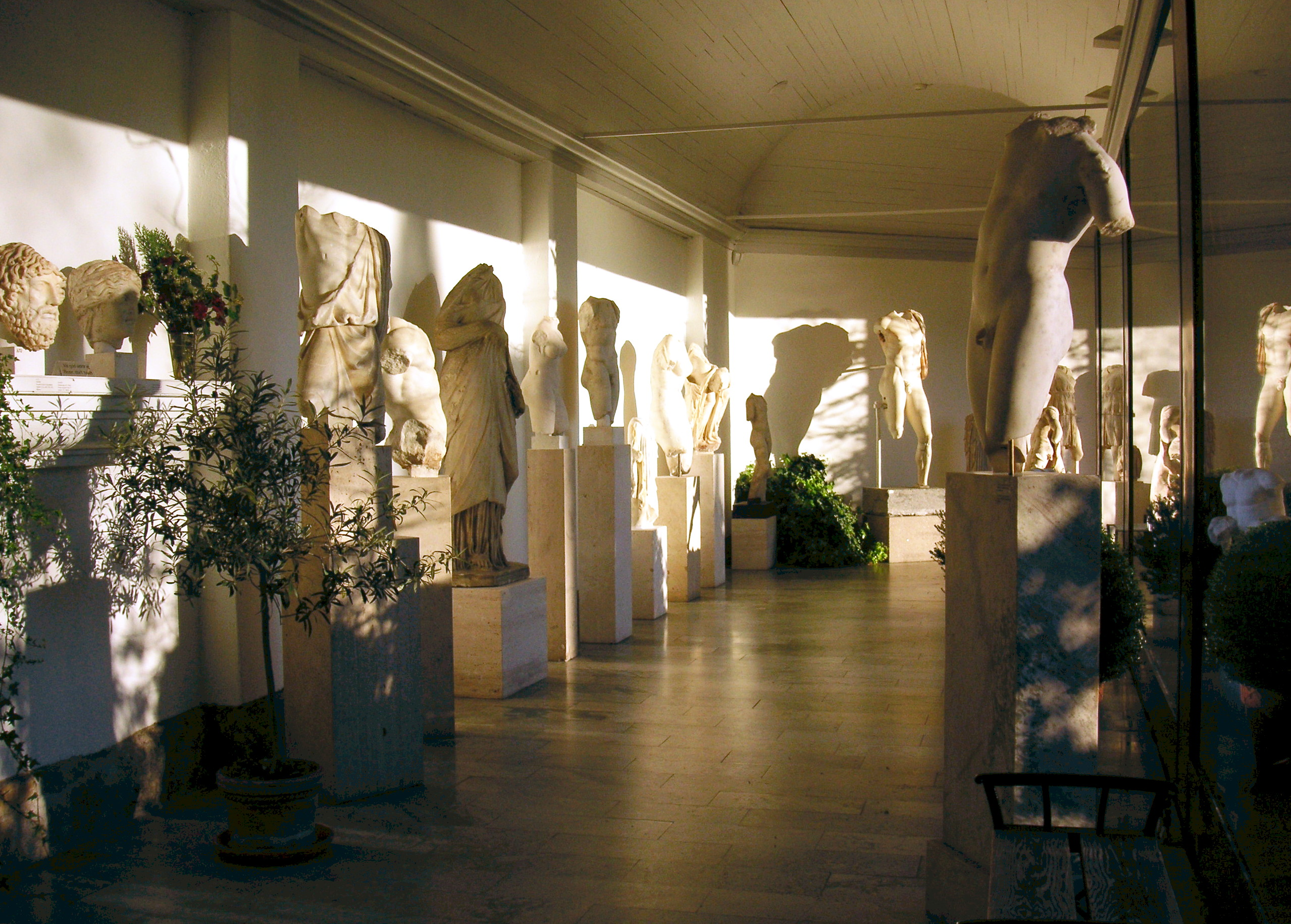
Milles antique collection

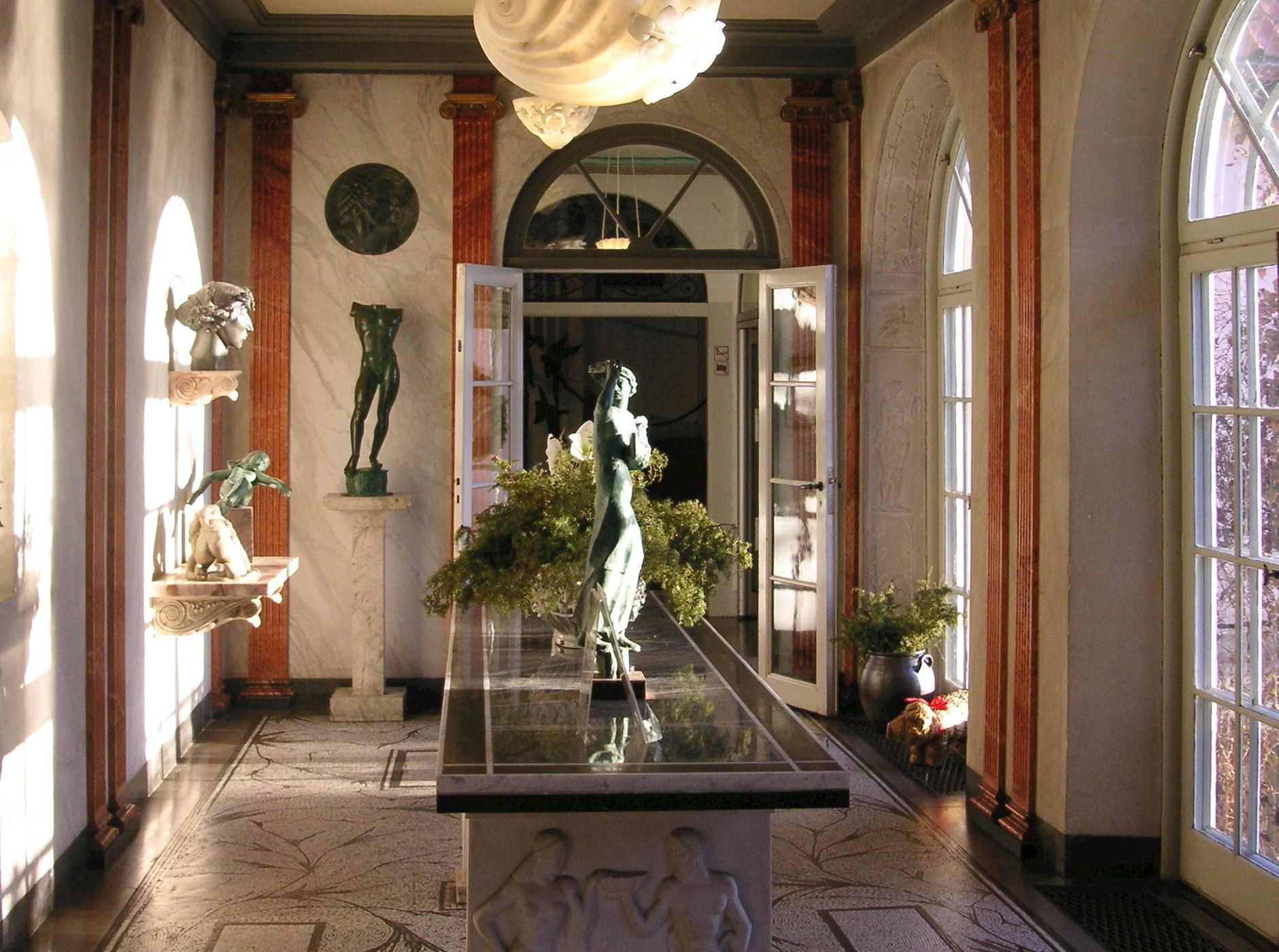
Interior

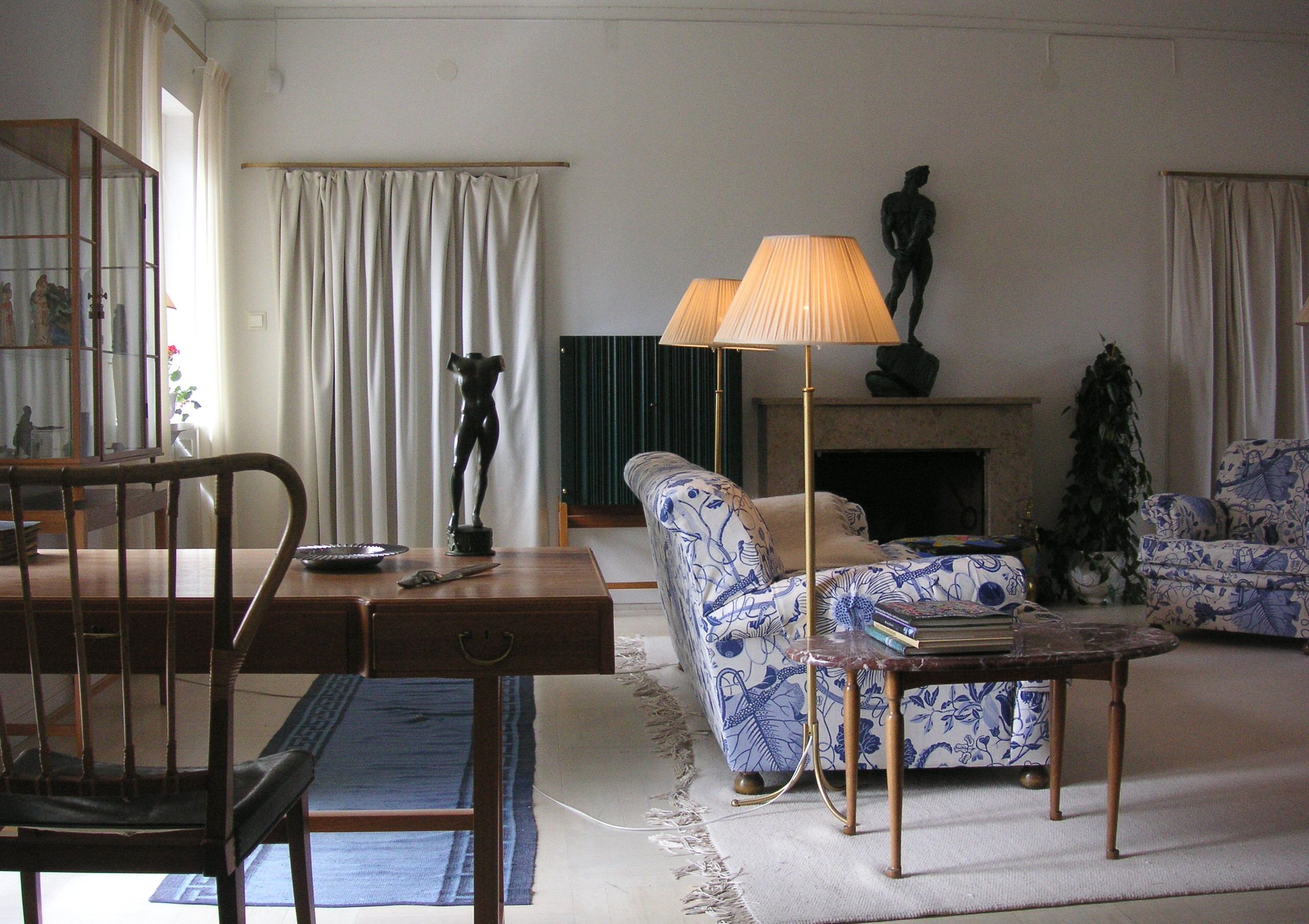
Living room in Anne's House

== See also ==
- List of museums in Stockholm
- List of single-artist museums

== Other sources ==
- Anders Bergström (2004) Millesgården - Arkitektur och trädgård (Stockholm: Atlantis) ISBN 91-7486-799-7
