= Finnish art =

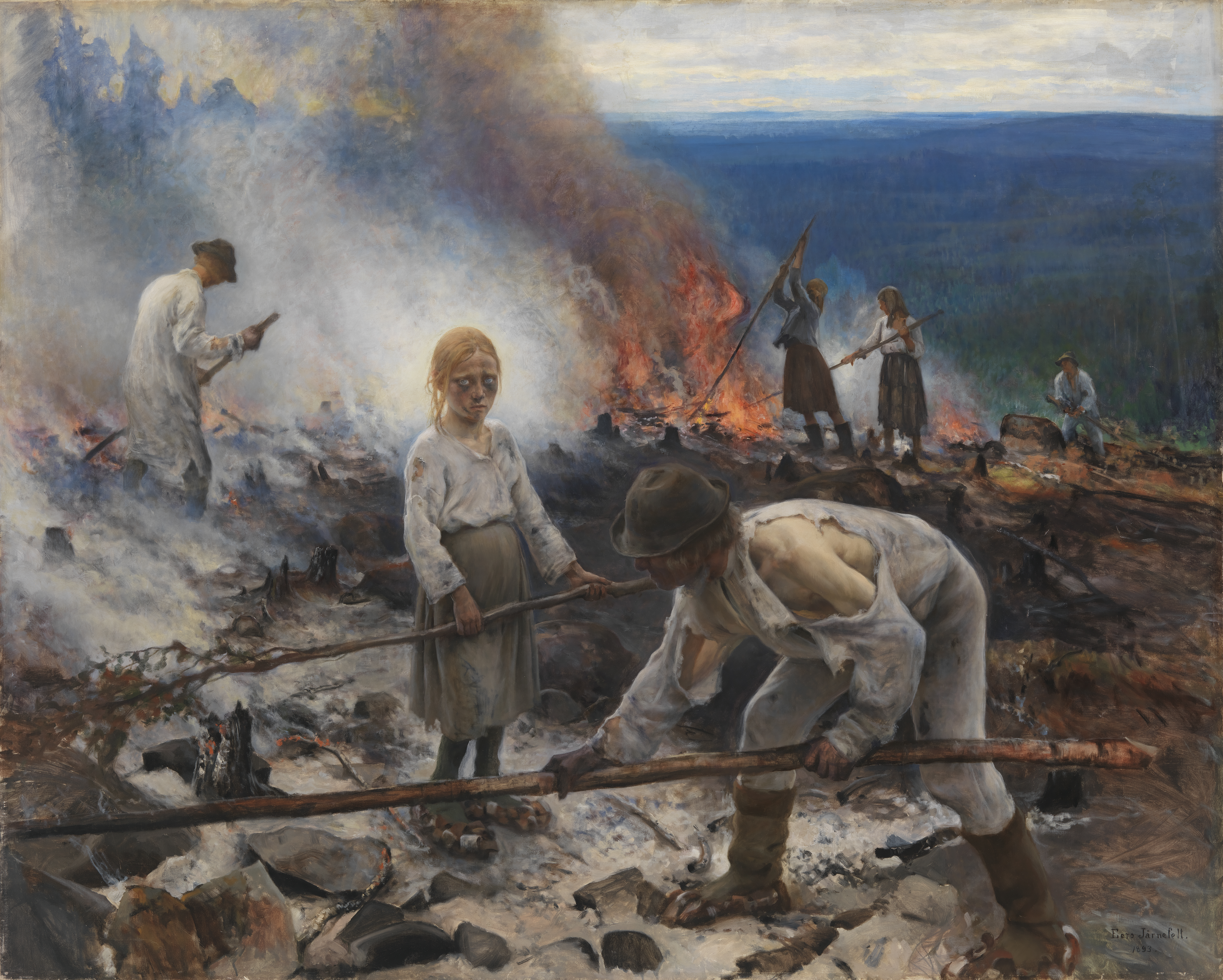
Under the Yoke (Burning the Brushwood), Eero Järnefelt, 1893

Finnish art started to form its individual characteristics in the 19th century when romantic nationalism began to rise in the autonomous Grand Duchy of Finland.

== Prehistoric art ==
Marks of human activity in Finland has found in Susiluola, Kristinestad. Some excavations have been considered man-made over 100,000 years ago. After the Ice Age, the area of Finland was resettled around 9,000 years ago and the first known sculpture Elk's Head of Huittinen (picture in stamp) has been dated about 5–7000 BCE.

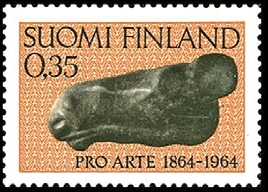
Elk's Head on a 1964 Finnish stamp

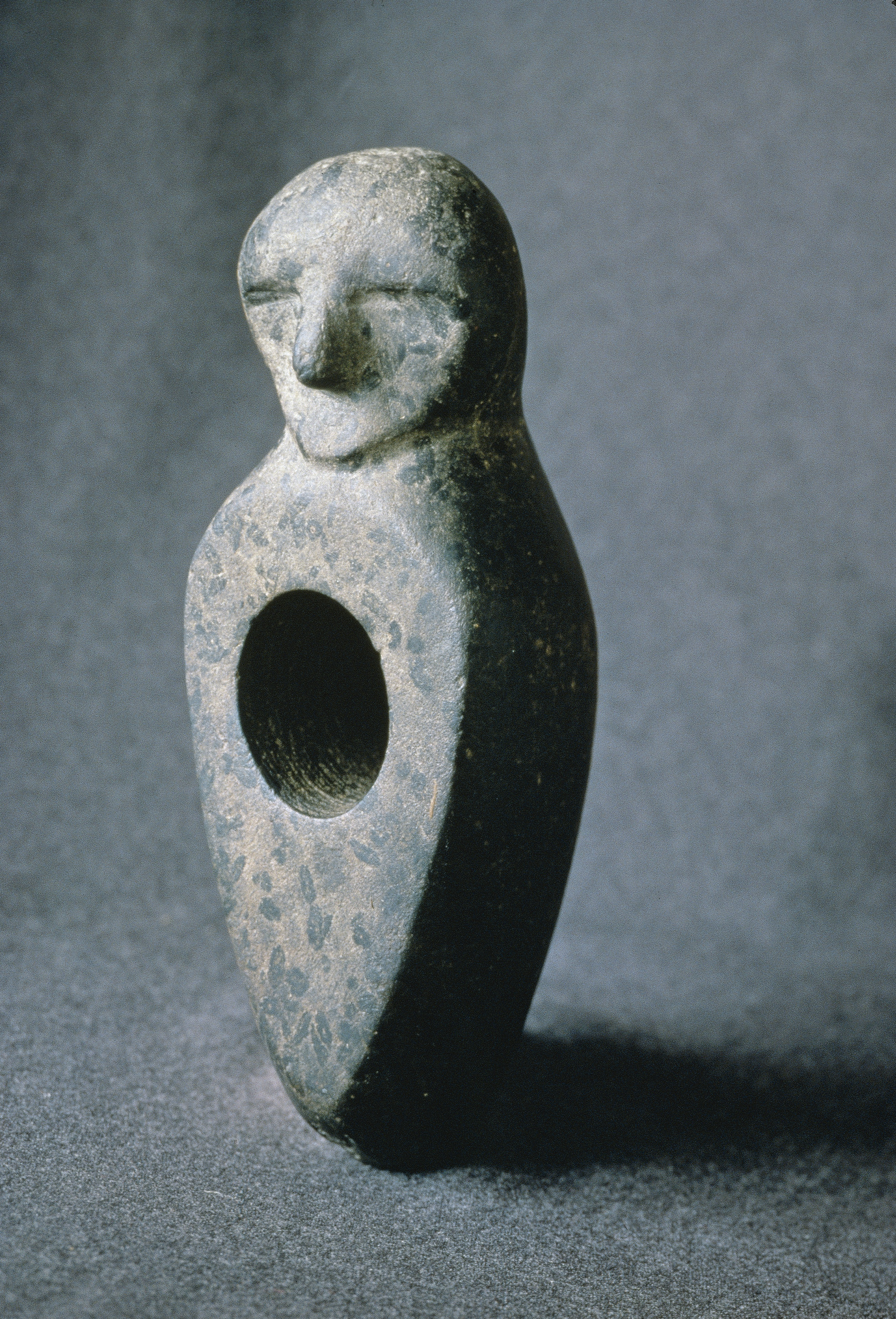
Stone age axe head with a human figure, Kiuruvesi

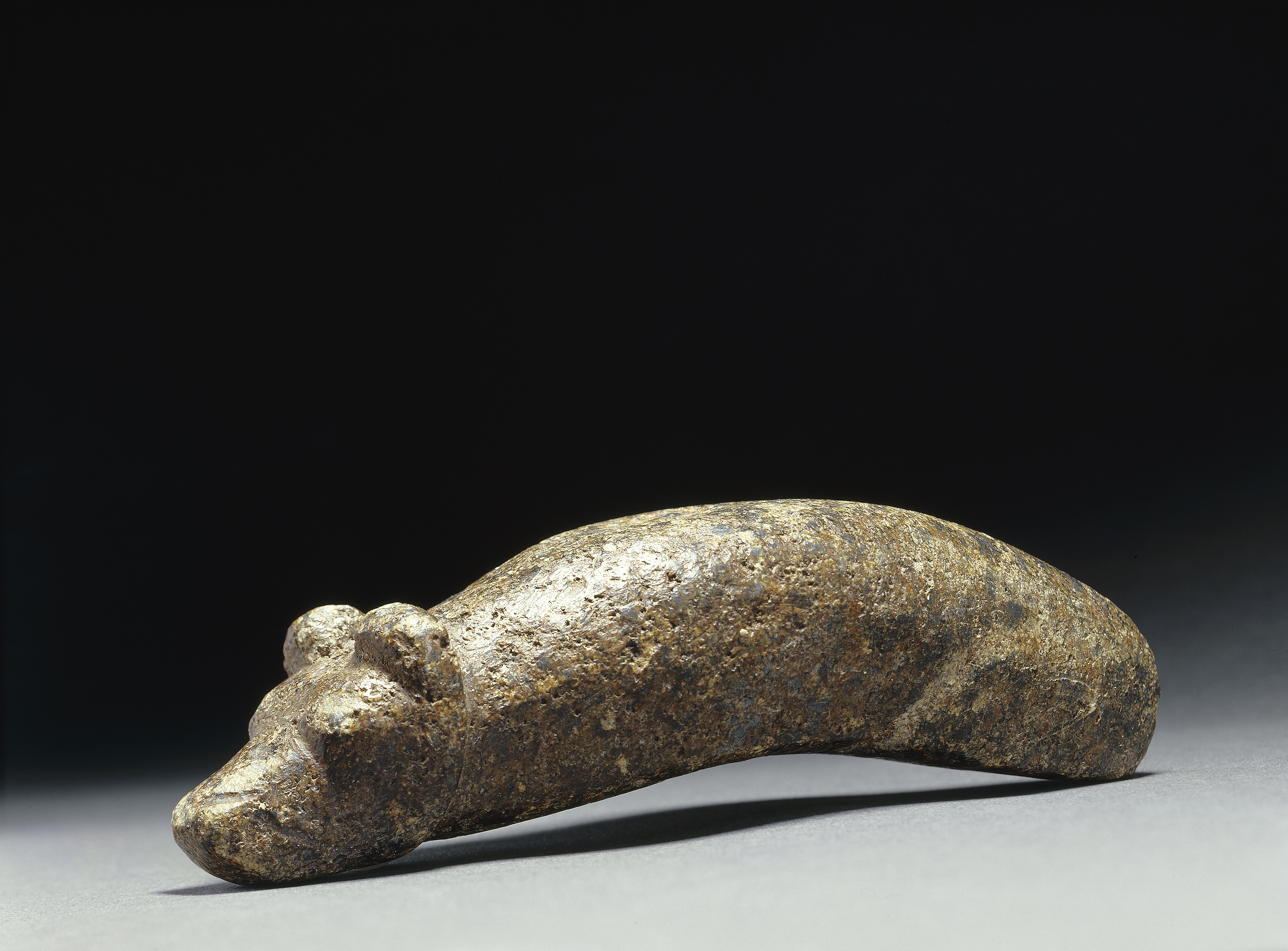
Stone age bear head cudgel, Paltamo

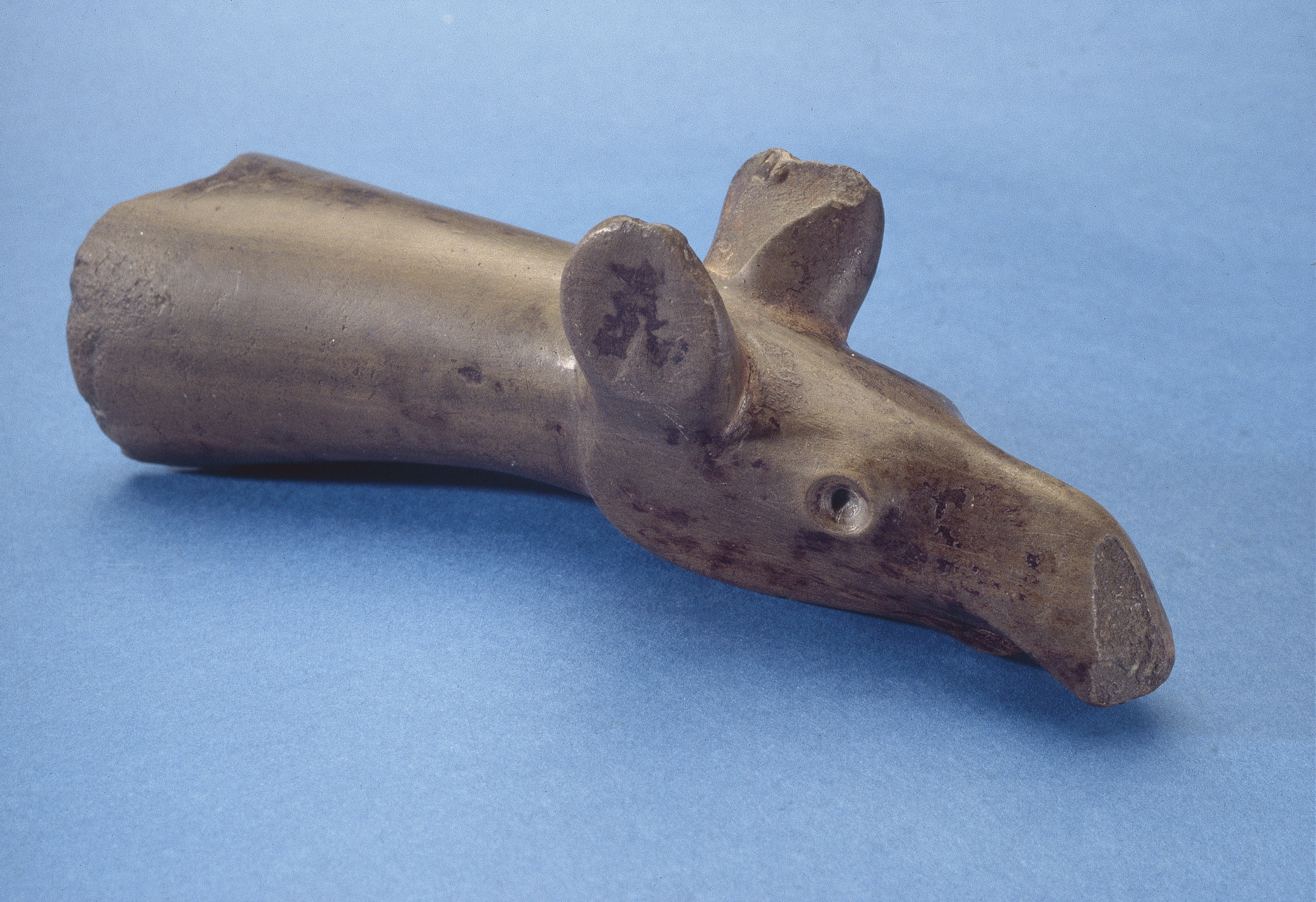
Moose head figurine

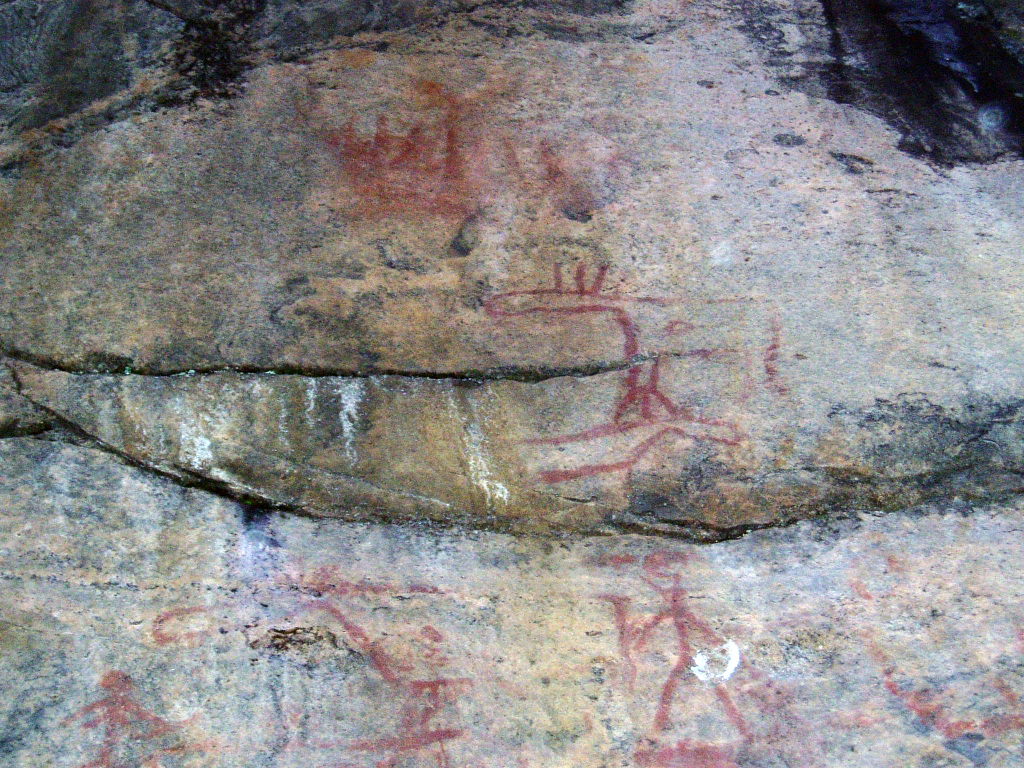
Astuvansalmi rock paintings (moose, human figures and a boat)

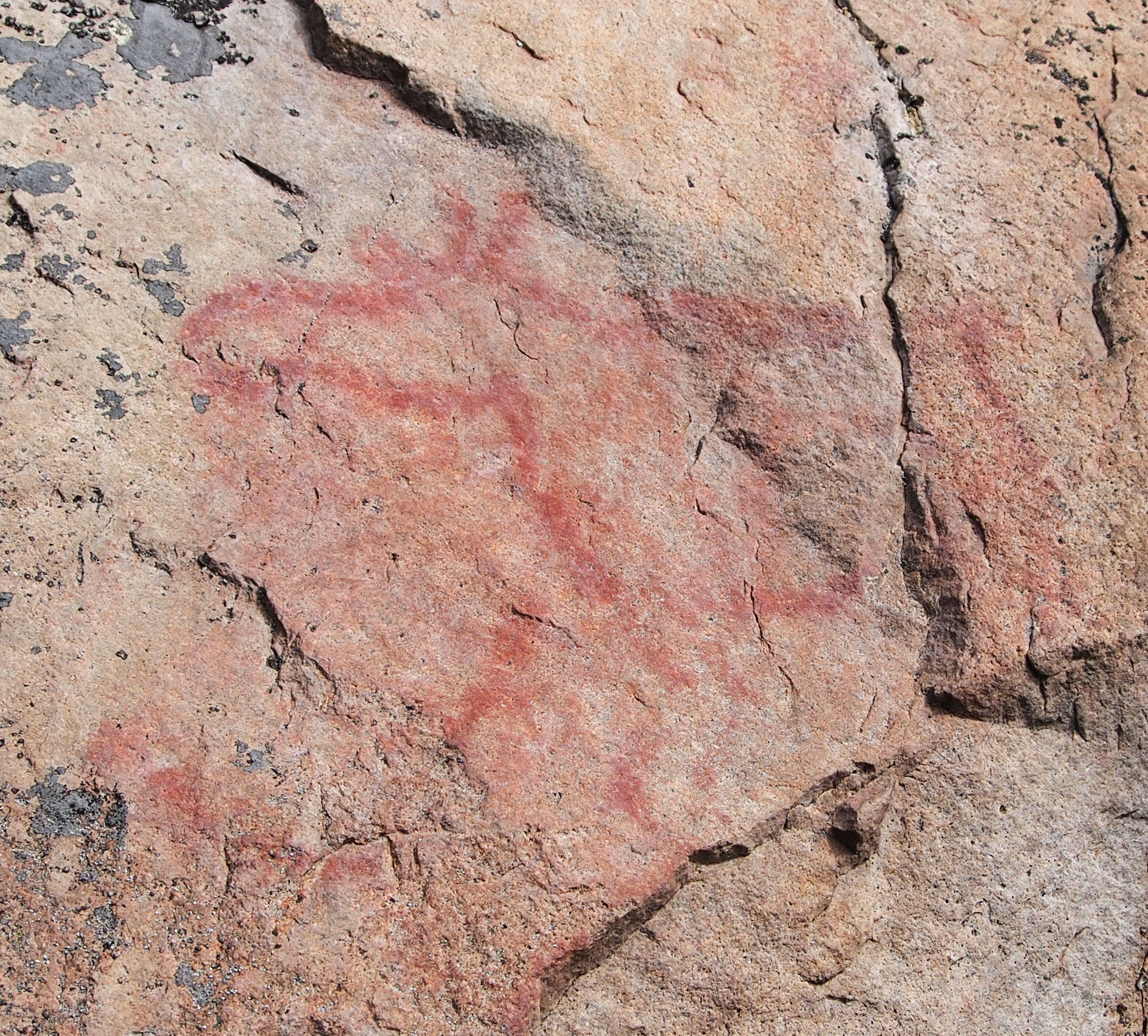
Saraakallio rock paintings (moose)

== Architecture ==
The most important products of medieval architecture in Finland are the medieval stone churches. More than a hundred of them were built during 15th and 16th centuries. Neoclassical architecture arrived in late 18th century, but important building projects started after 1808 when Finland was an autonomous part of Russia. Alexander II of Russia commissioned Carl Ludvig Engel to plan the new Senate and University for Helsinki.

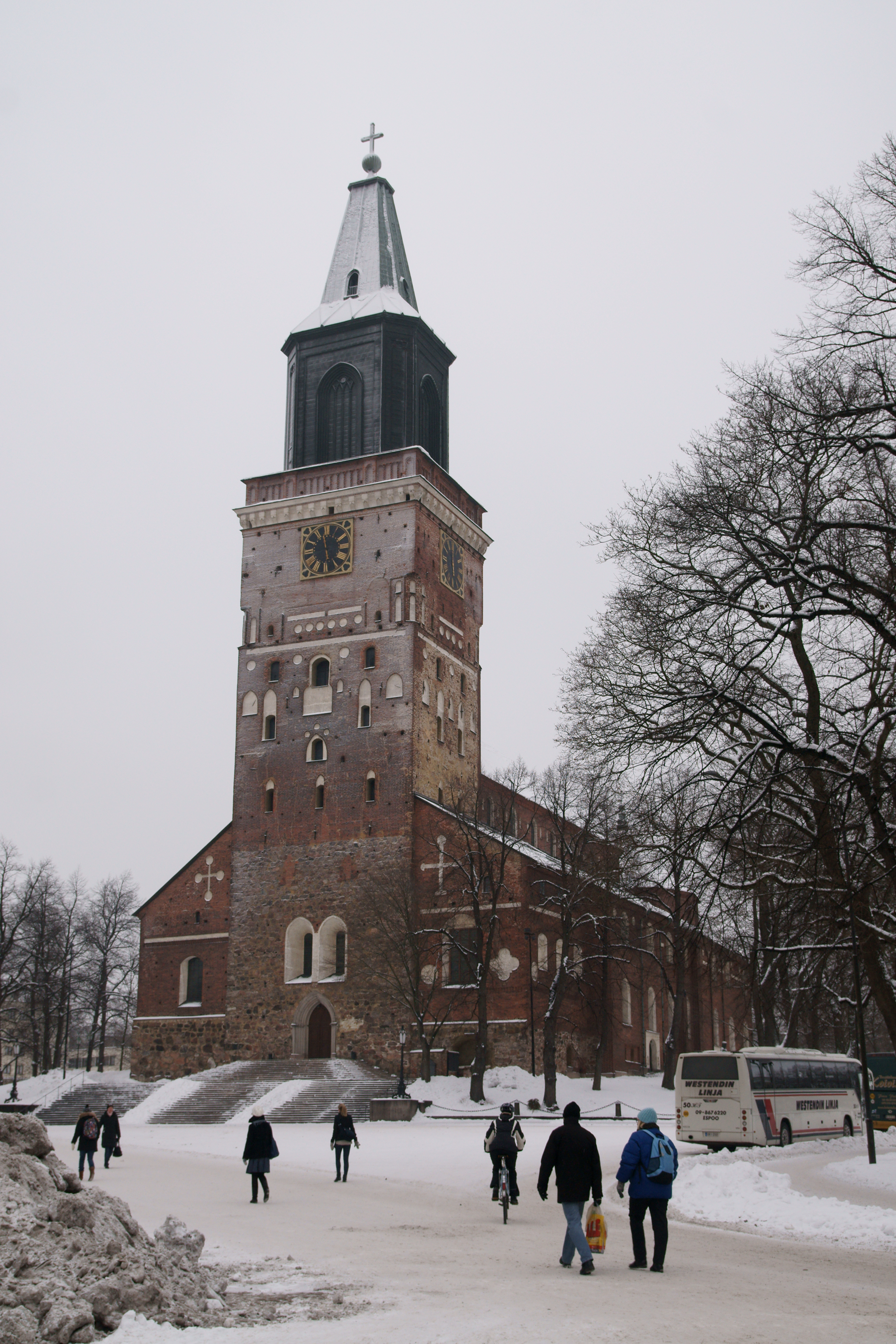
Turku Cathedral

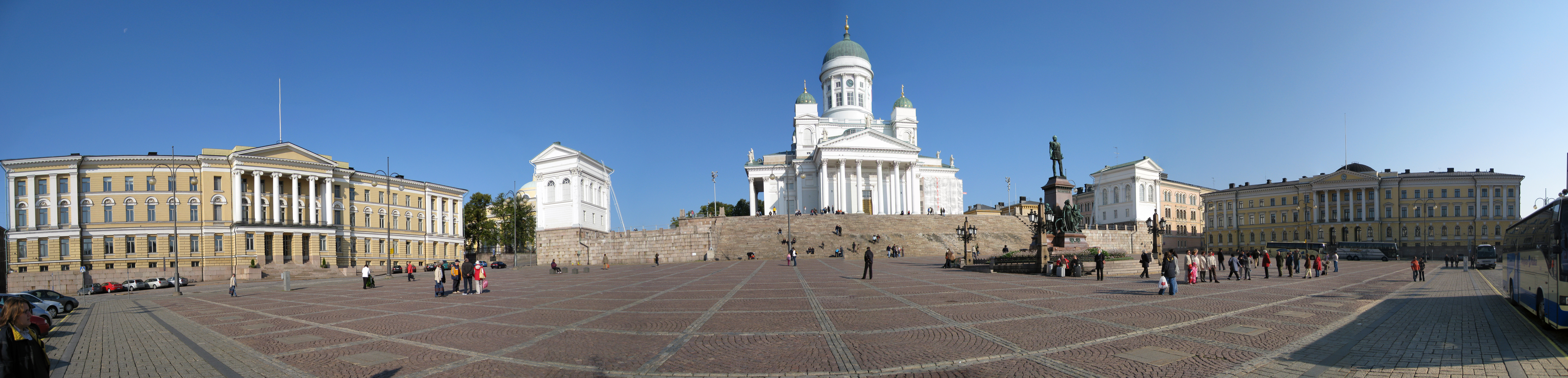
Panorama of the Helsinki Senate Square, designed by Carl Ludvig Engel. From left: the main building of University of Helsinki, Helsinki Cathedral, Government Palace. At the center is a statue of Alexander II by Walter Runeberg.

== Academic visual arts ==
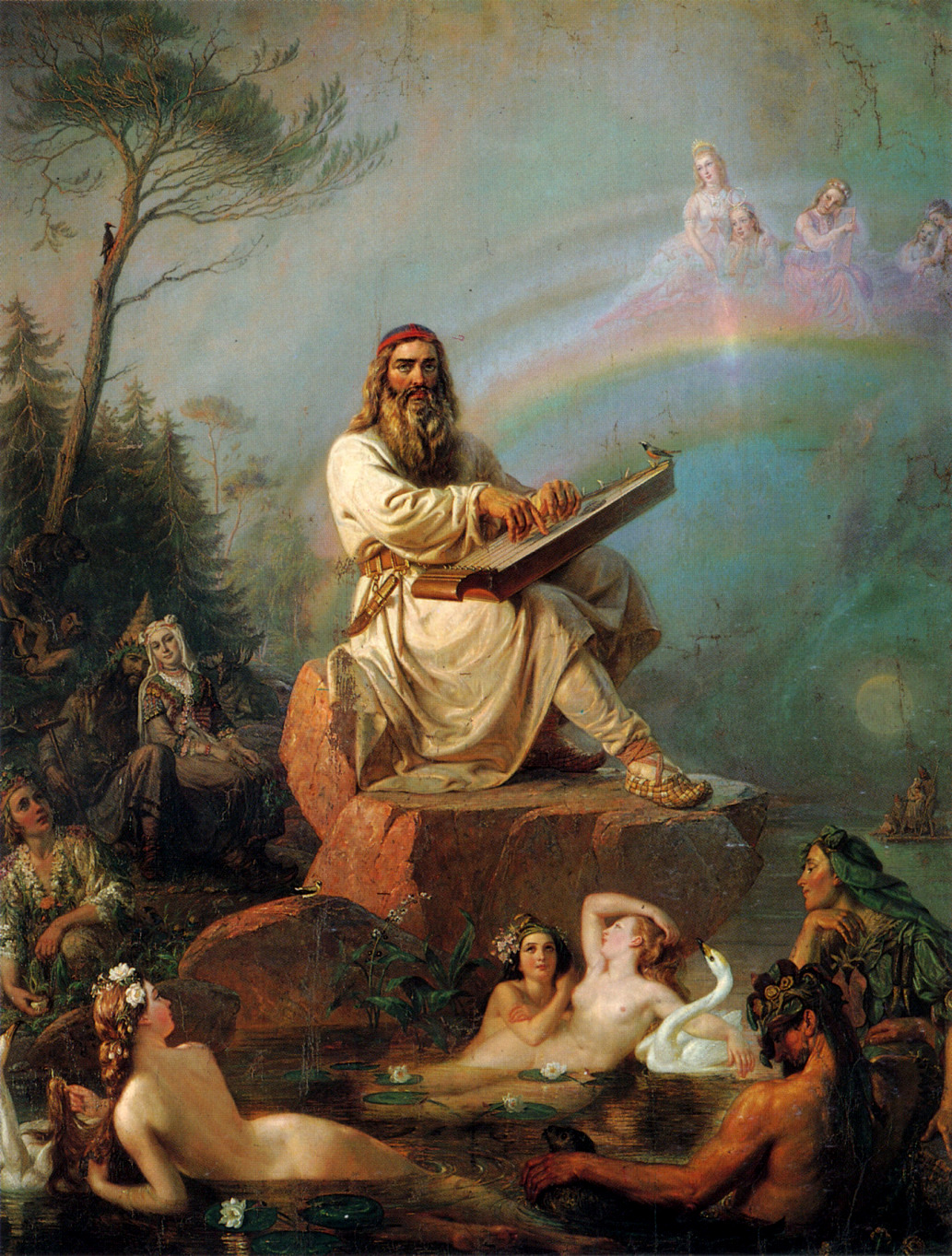
Väinämöinen's play, Robert Wilhelm Ekman, 1866

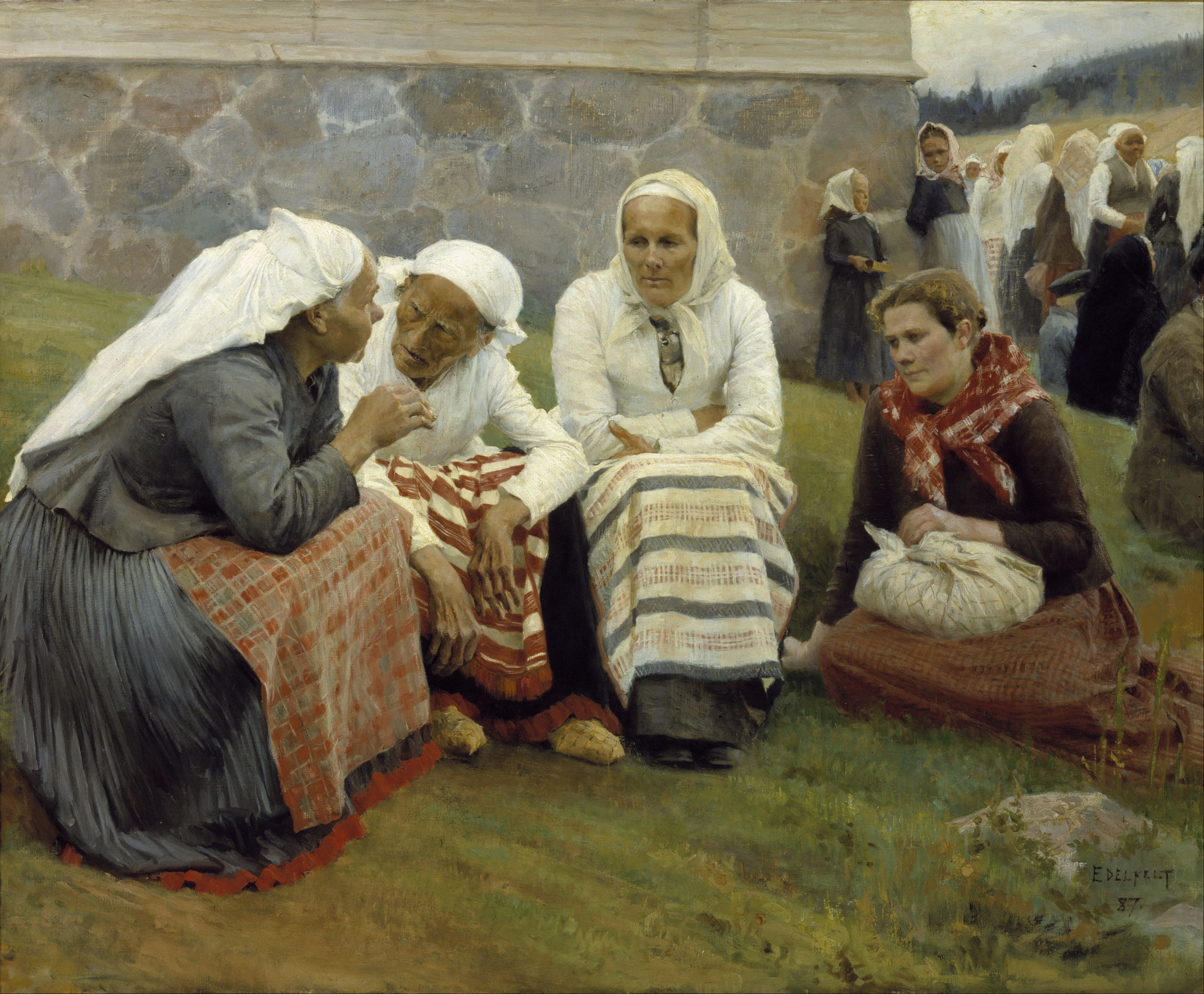
Women outside the Church at Ruokolahti, Albert Edelfelt, 1887

The Finnish academic drawing tradition began at the Royal Academy of Turku in 1707 when the first instructions for drawing were given. In 1824 The School moved with the University to Helsinki and the first Finland’s art exhibition was organised at the Drawing School in the autumn of 1845. Painting was rising in the Golden era of Finnish art in the 1880s, when romantic nationalism was the spirit of art. Akseli Gallen-Kallela started in naturalism but moved to national romanticism.

== Modern art ==
In the 1950s Finnish artists looked for foreign influence: first in Paris, then in the United States but also in Stockholm, where modern art exhibitions were organized in Moderna Museet. Abstract art made its breakthrough first in concrete art. Early concretists included Birger Carlstedt and Sam Vanni. When Vanni's monumental painting Contrapunctus (1959) won the competition for a mural in Helsinki, abstract art was considered to be accepted and established in Finland.

Informalism spread quickly in the 1950s and 1960s when it was considered a new approach to landscape painting. It was also building on a strong tradition of expressionism. It spread even outside of large cities.

In the late 20th century, the homoerotic art of Touko Valio Laaksonen, pseudonym Tom of Finland, found a worldwide audience, with his works entering the collection of the Museum of Modern Art in New York and appearing on Finnish postage stamps.

The Finnish contemporary art scene became much more visible than before with the establishment of Kiasma, the Museum of Contemporary Art in Helsinki in 1998.

In 2020 Ateneum held an exhibition called The story of Finnish art where a number of the most popular Finnish paintings were exhibited, some of which are the following
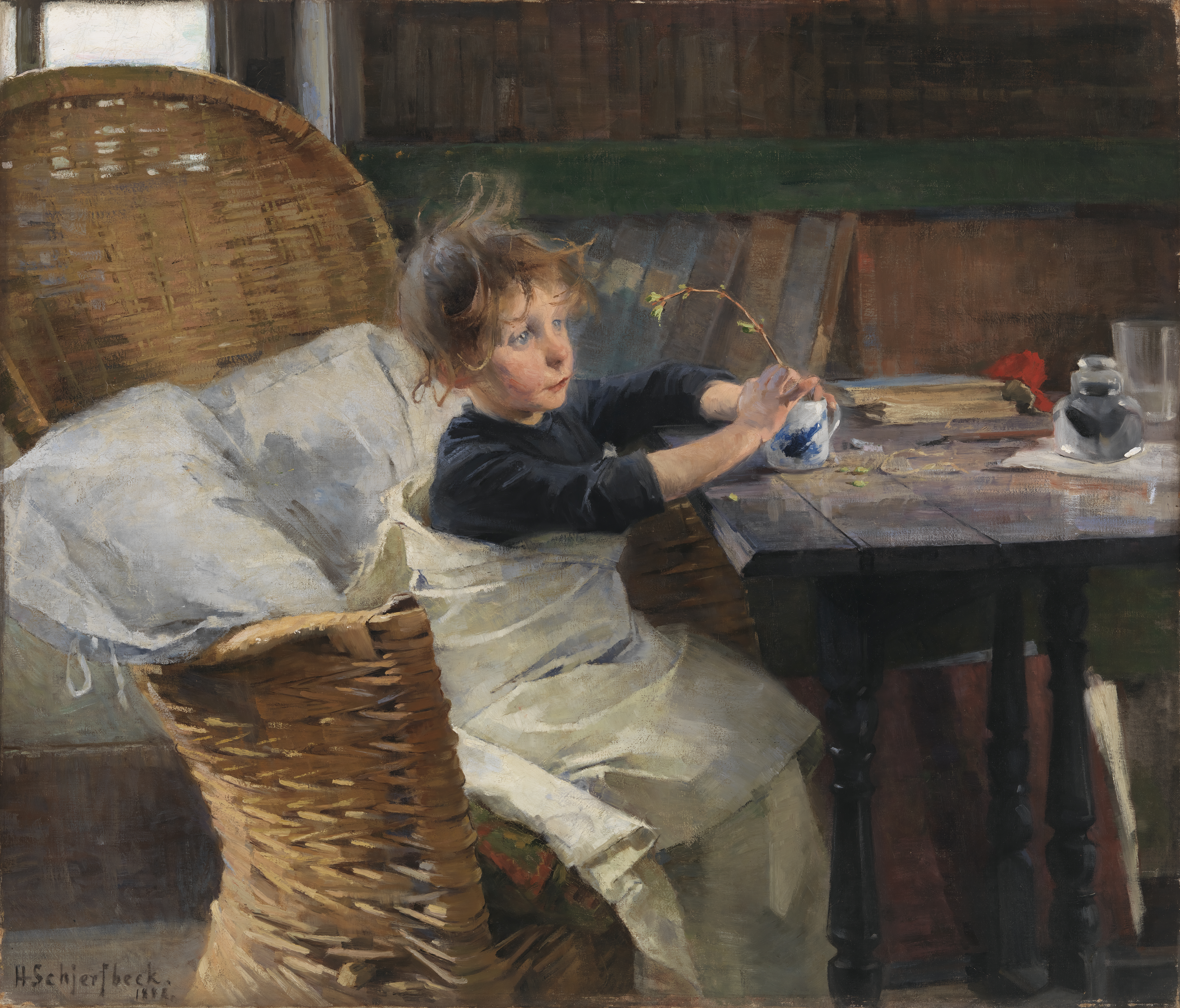
The Convalescent, Helene Schjerfbeck, 1888

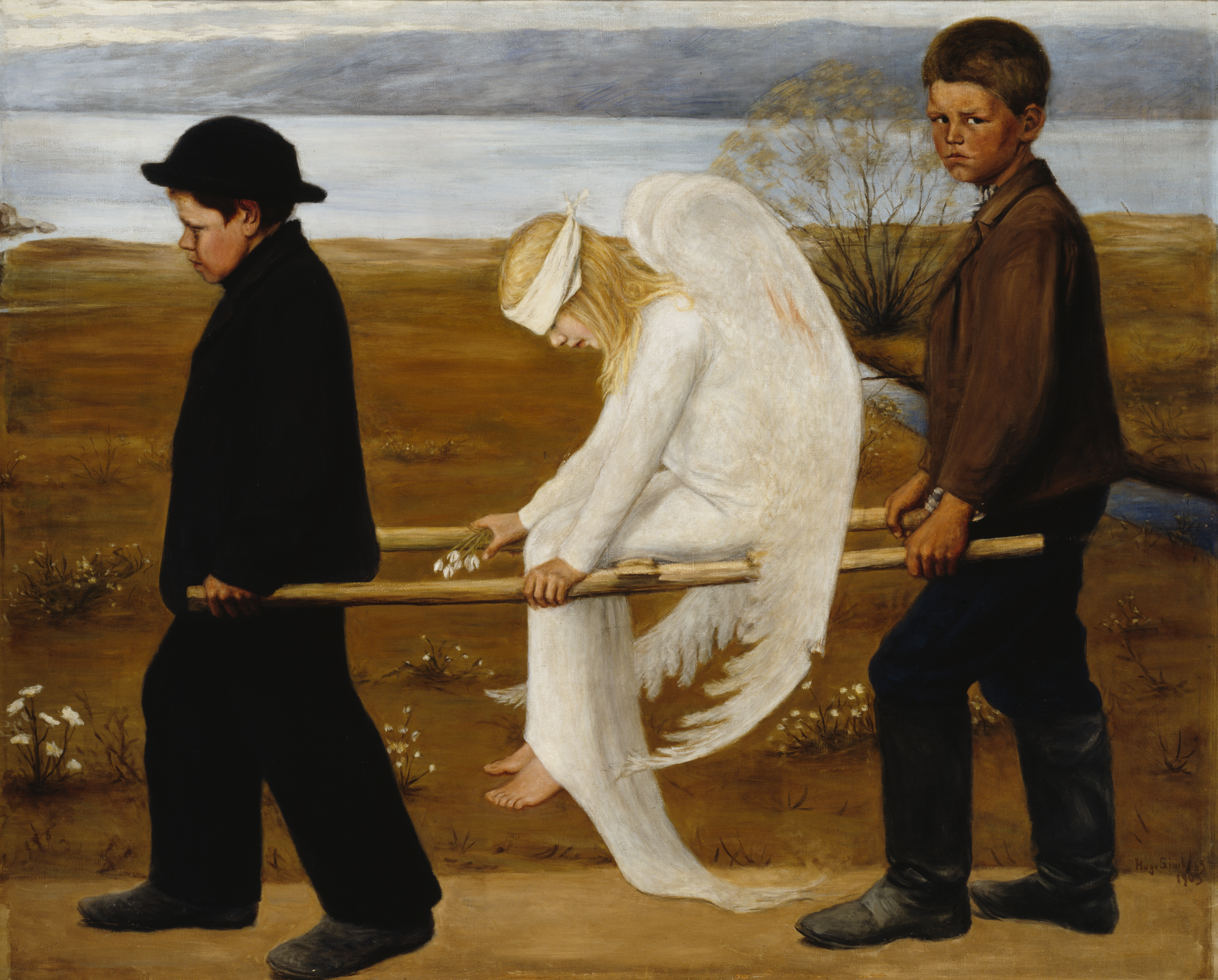
The Wounded Angel, Hugo Simberg, 1903

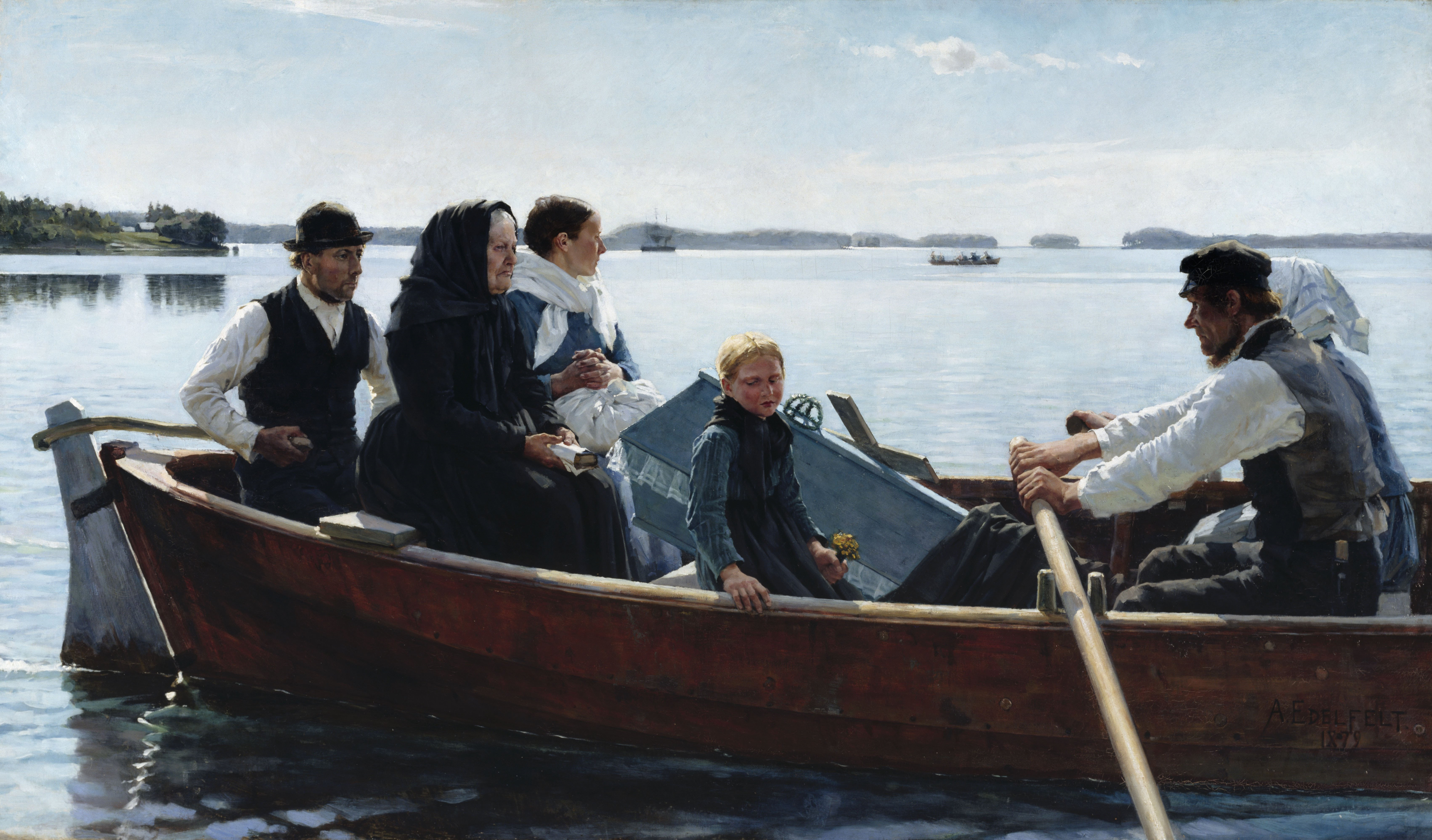
Conveying a Child's Coffin, Albert Edelfelt, 1879

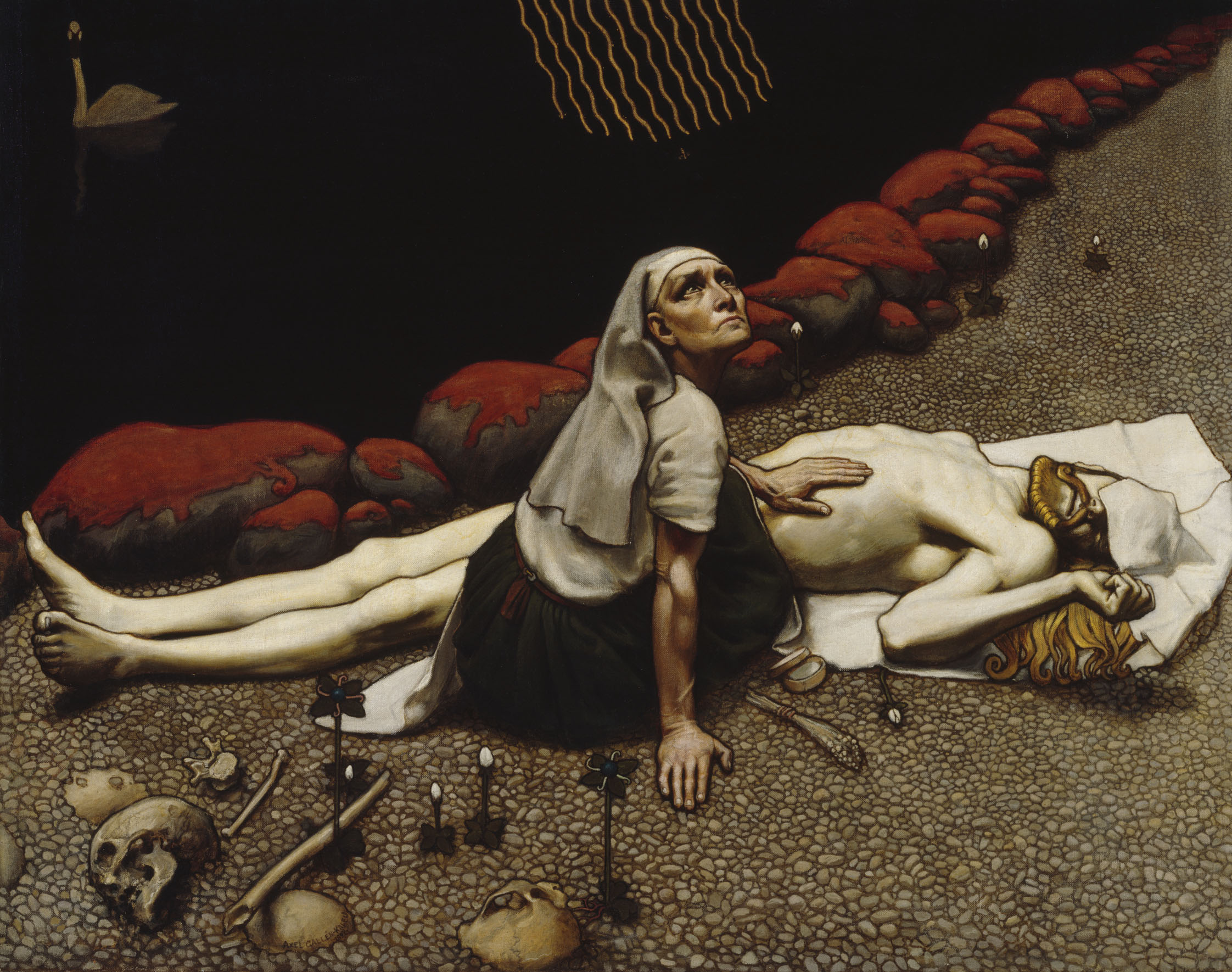
Lemminkäinen's Mother, Akseli Gallen-Kallela, 1897

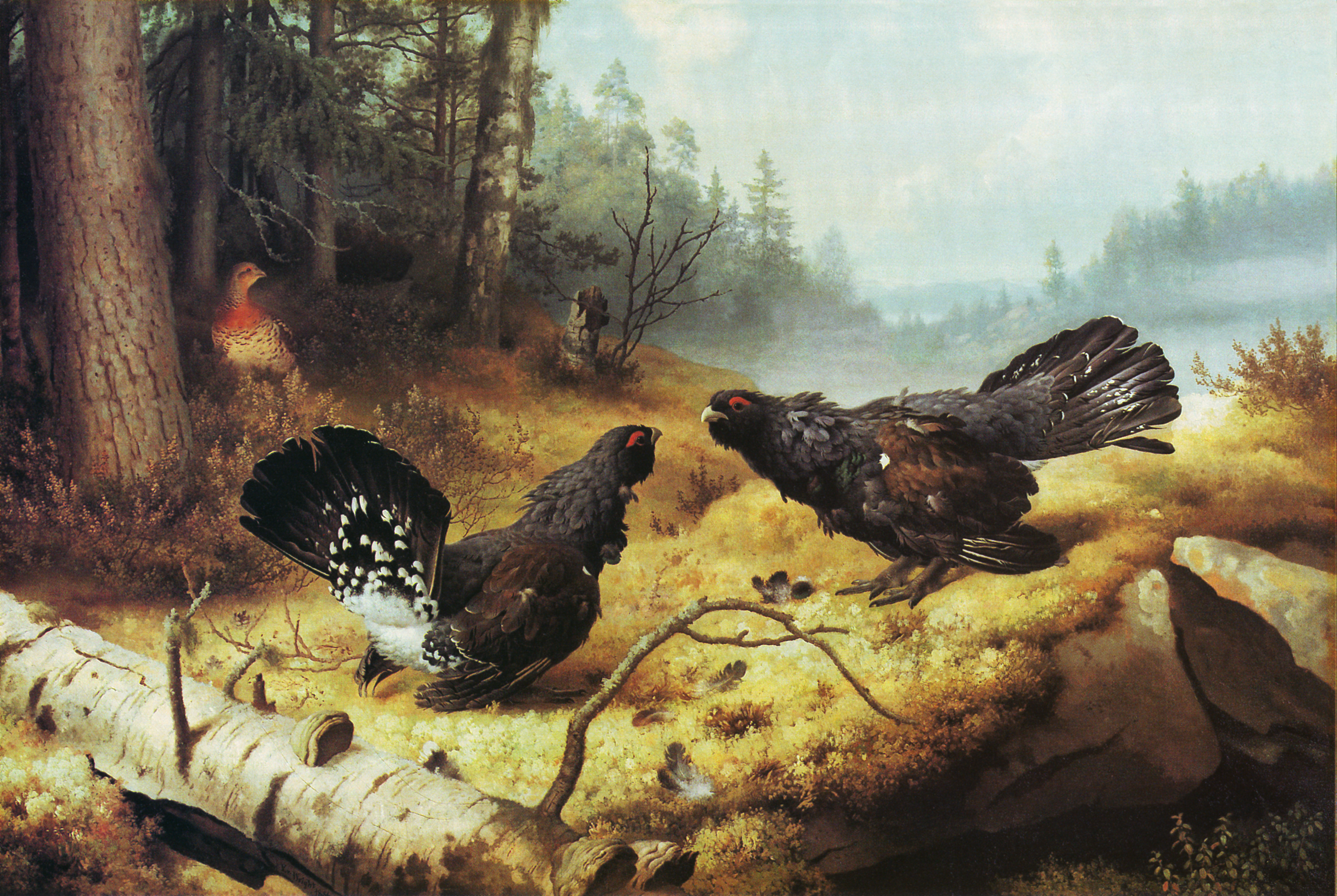
The Fighting Capercaillies, Ferdinand von Wright, 1886

Road in Häme (A Hot Summer Day), Werner Holmberg, 1860

== See also ==
- Culture of Finland
- Golden Age of Finnish Art
- Suomiart
- List of Finnish painters
- List of Finnish architects
- Category:Finnish sculptors by century
- Category:Finnish artists by century
