= Vainionpää =

Vainionpää is a Finnish surname, 'vainio' is 'meadow', 'pää' is 'head'. Notable people with the surname include:

- Laura Vainionpää (born 1994), Finnish racing cyclist
- Matias Vainionpää (born 2001), Finnish footballer
- Riitta Vainionpää (1952–2021), Finnish-Swedish textile artist
