= Werner Holmberg =

Finnish painter (1830–1860)

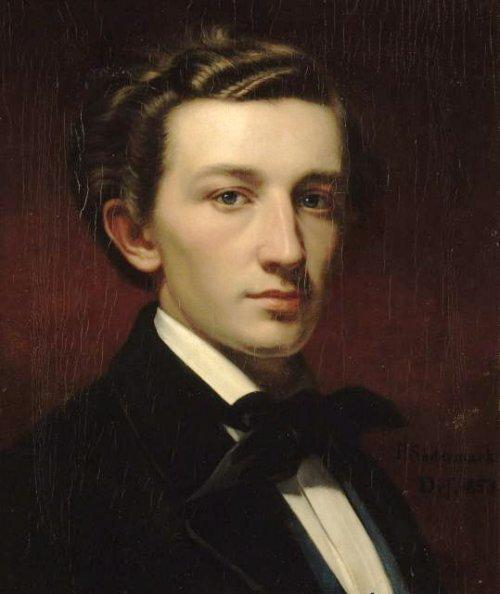
- Portrait of Holmberg by Per Södermark in 1853
- Born: 1 November 1830; Helsinki, Grand Duchy of Finland, Russian Empire (now Finland)
- Died: 24 September 1860 (aged 29); Düsseldorf, German Confederation

Gustaf Werner Holmberg (1 November 1830 – 24 September 1860) was a Finnish landscape painter.

== Biography ==
=== Early life ===
Holmberg was born in Helsinki. His father was Olof Henrik Holmberg (1799–1863) and mother Josefina Gustava Federley (1806–1840). His mother died from a lung disease and Olof raised his six surviving children with the help of his sisters. Werner was interested in painting from a young age, taking private lessons from Pehr Adolf Kruskopf and later Magnus von Wright. He also learned oil painting from Johan Erik Lindh. In 1848 he became a student at the just-formed Academy of Fine Arts. However his father Olof wanted his son to study law, so in his first year of university studies he also worked part-time at the National Board of Customs. At the university he learned painting from Berndt Godenhjelm and von Wright again. In 1850 he helped Robert Wilhelm Ekman paint frescoes in the Turku cathedral. In 1853 he finished his studies.

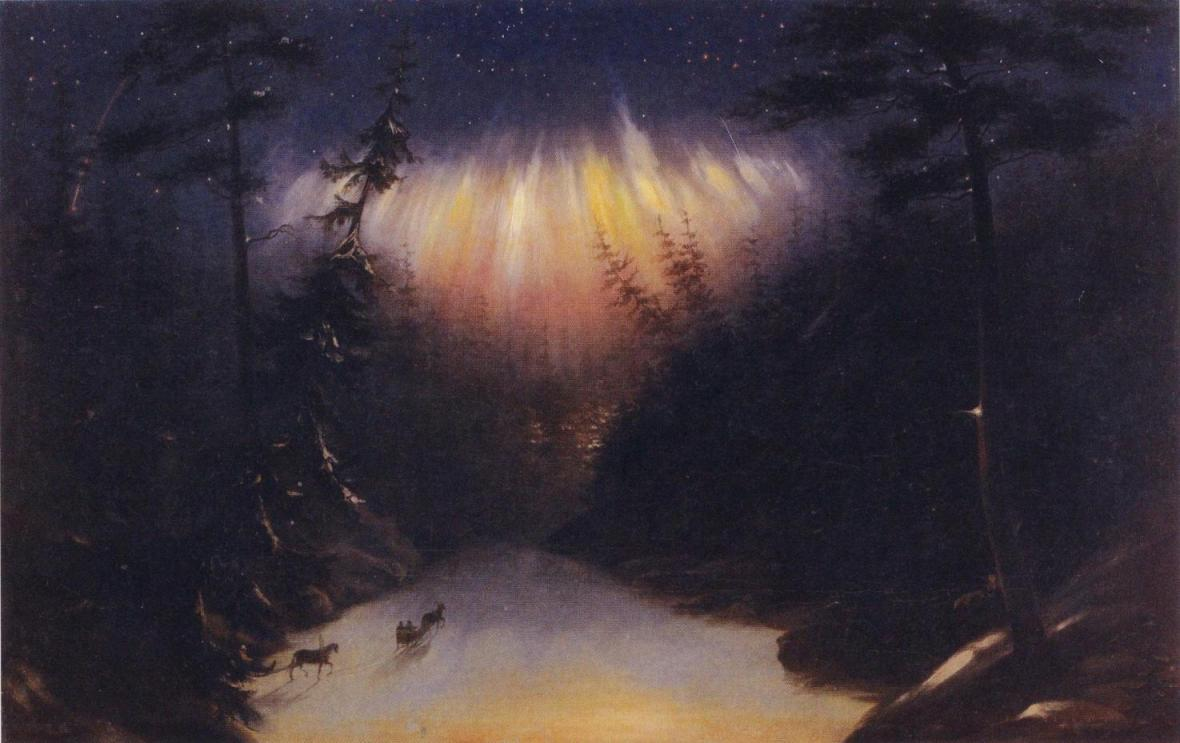
Aurora, 1849

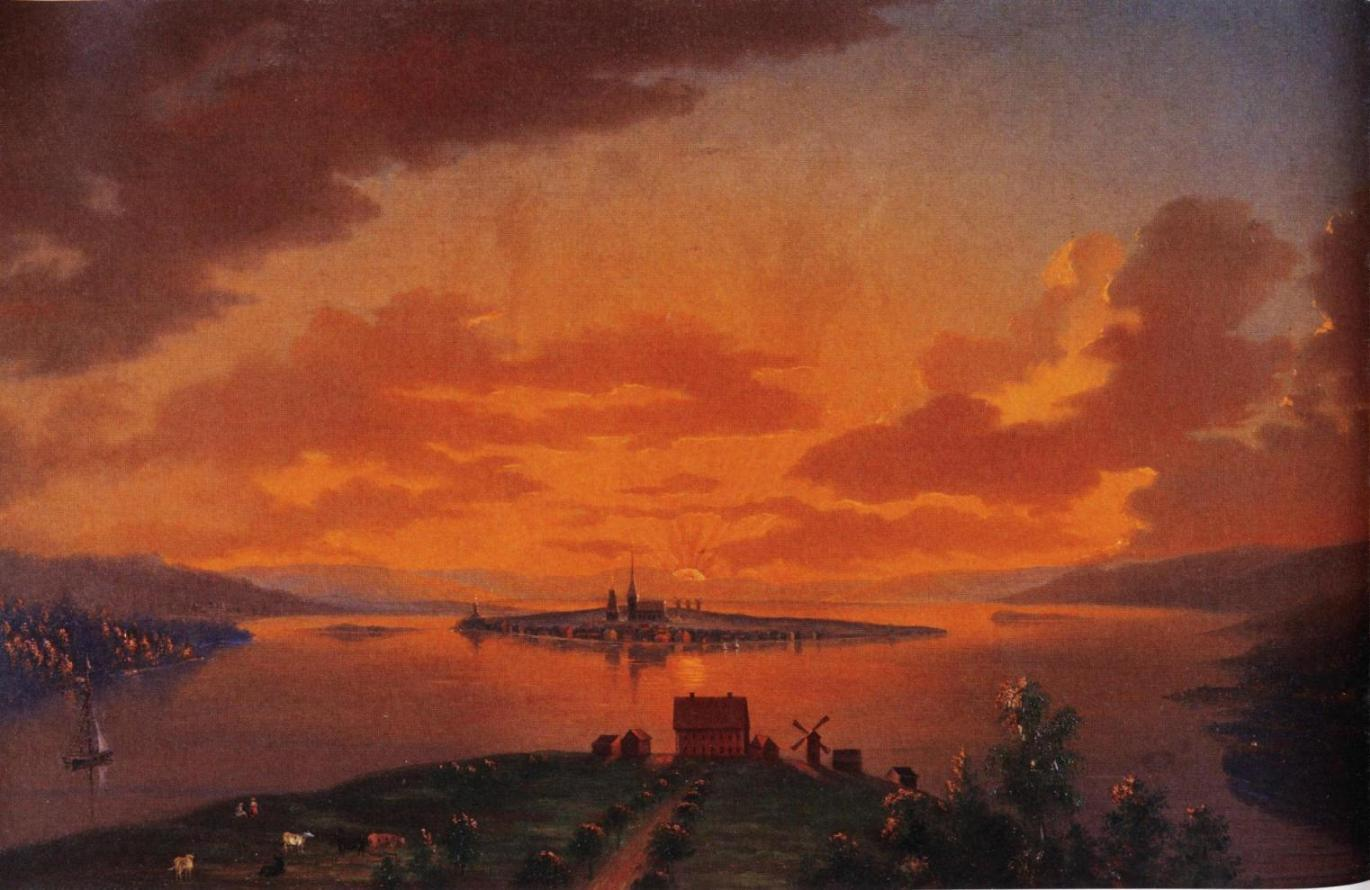
Midsummer Day's Night at Tornio, 1849

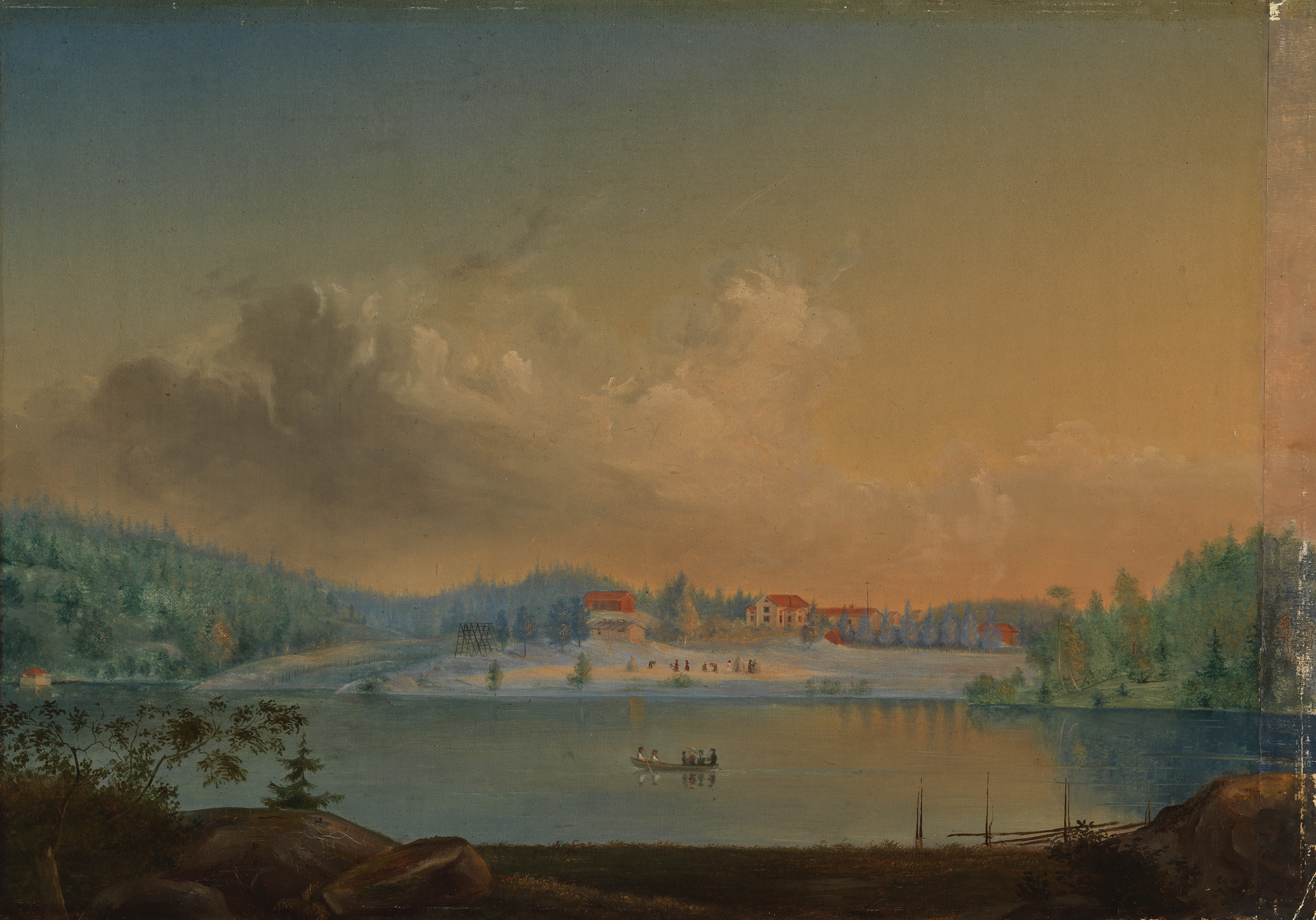
Storms or Degervik crown office at Kirkkonummi, 1852

=== Study at Düsseldorf ===
In July 1853 he moved to Düsseldorf as the first Finnish art student, after many Norwegian and Swedish art students had already gone there to study. He studied there under Hans Gude. Erik Bodom was also recruited to help him with his work. Nordic topics were popular in Germany, and he first focused on them with works such as The Kyrö Rapids. His breakthrough was in 1856 with Autumn Morning, and with the new-found fame he was able to quickly sell all of his paintings. By this point Gude recognized Holmberg as fully trained and ended his tutorship, although they still kept close contact. As he ran out sketches of Finland, he began painting German landscapes.

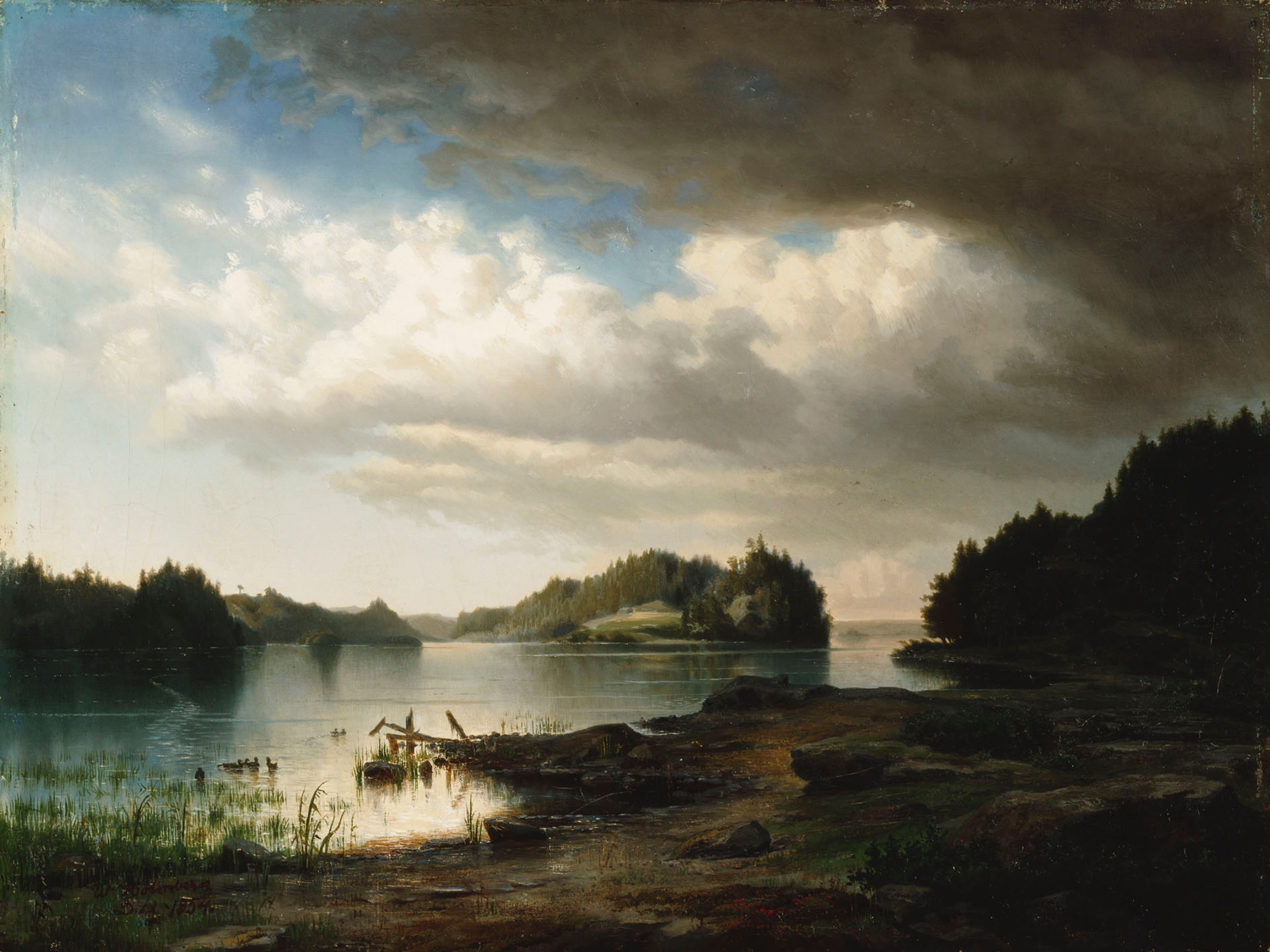
Finnish Lake Landscape, 1854

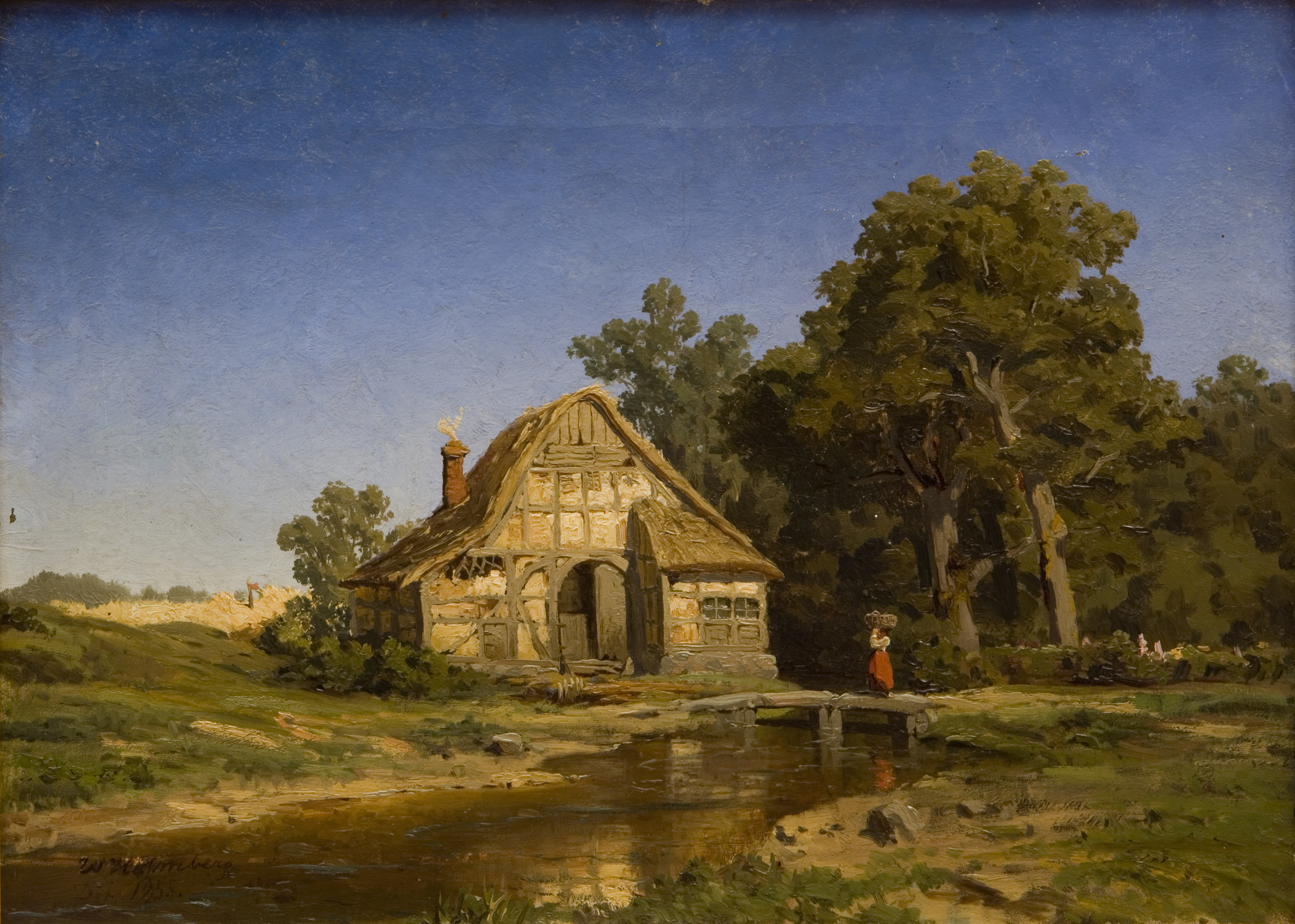
German Landscape, 1855

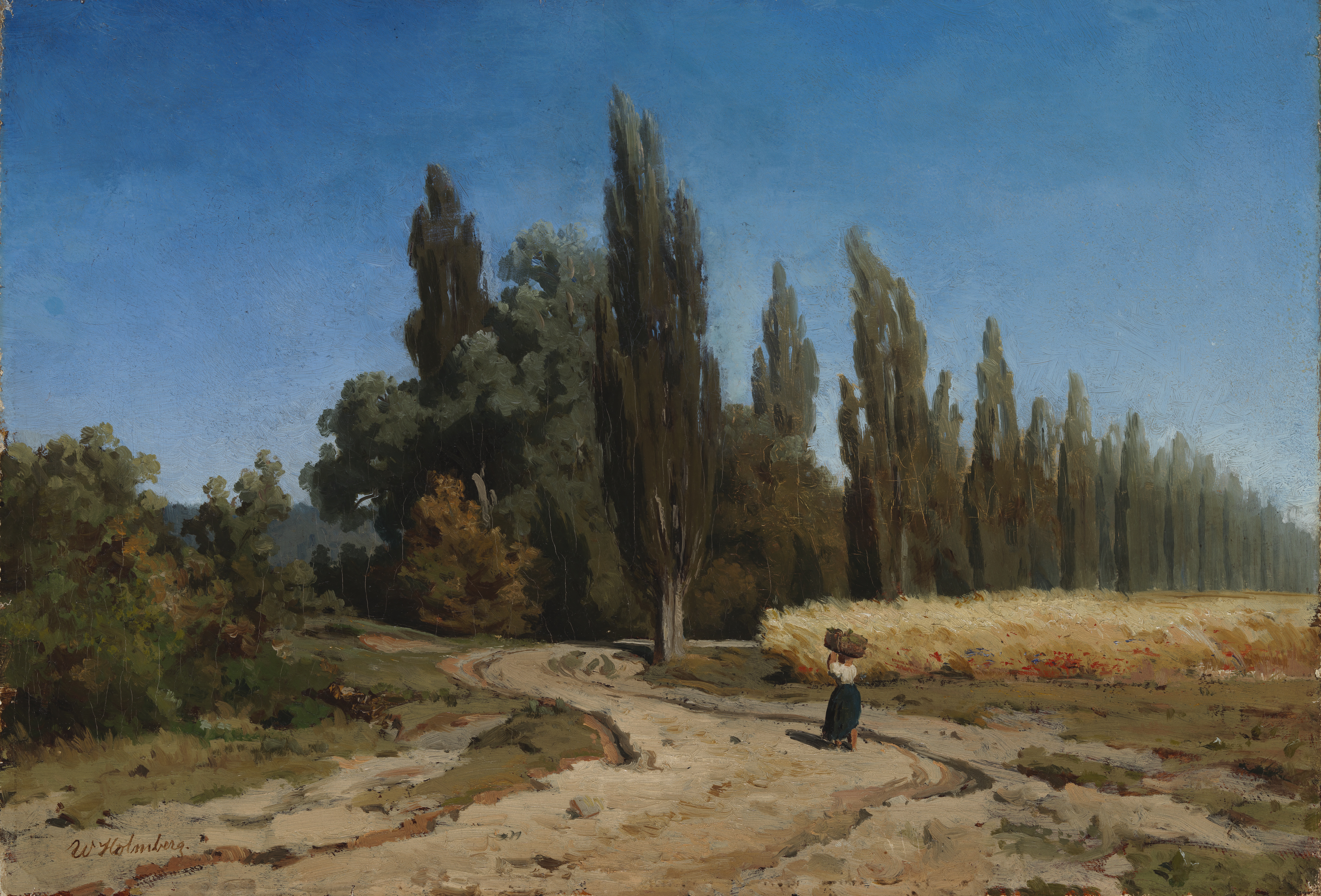
Poplar Alley, 1856

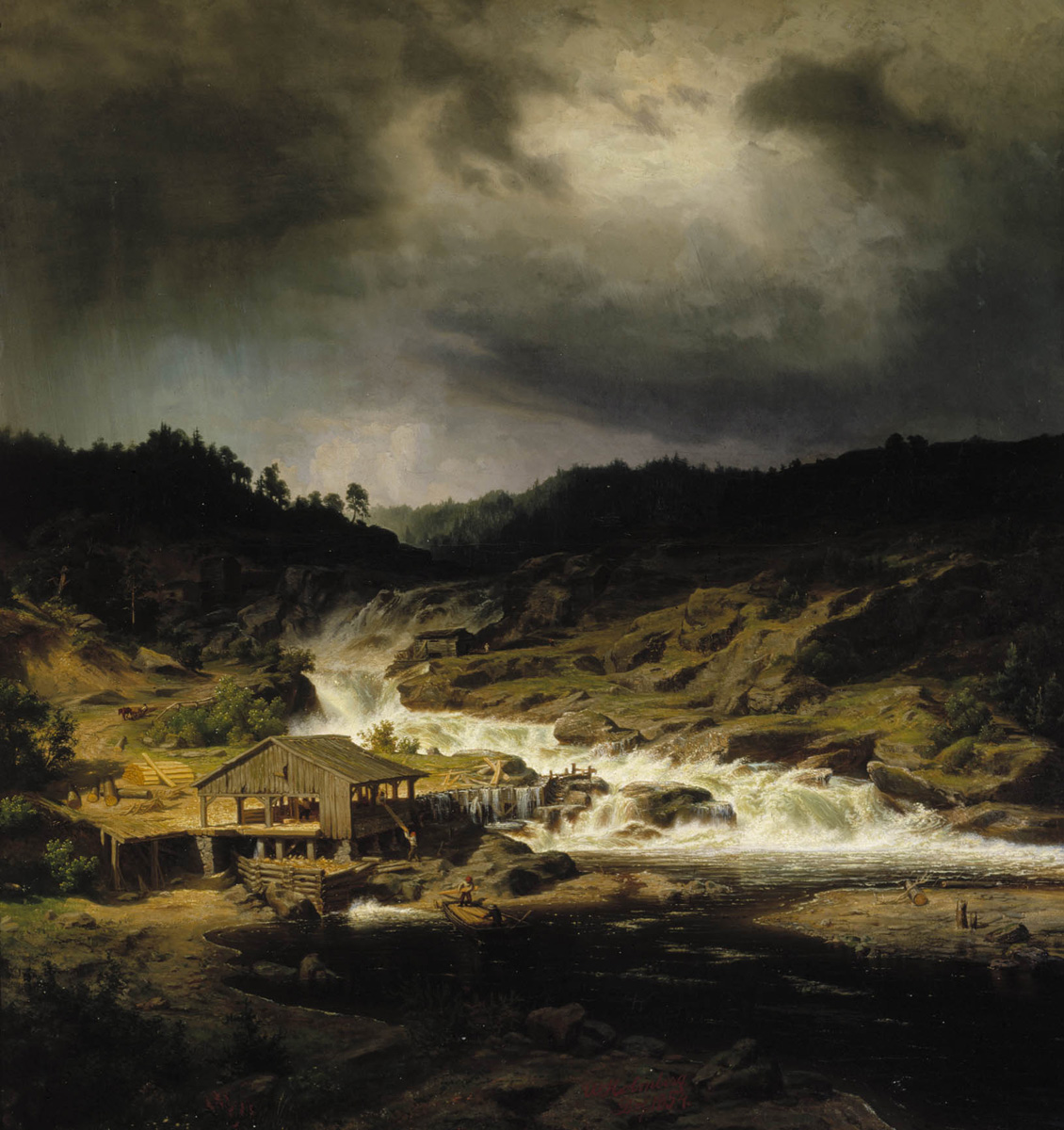
The Kyrö Rapids, 1856

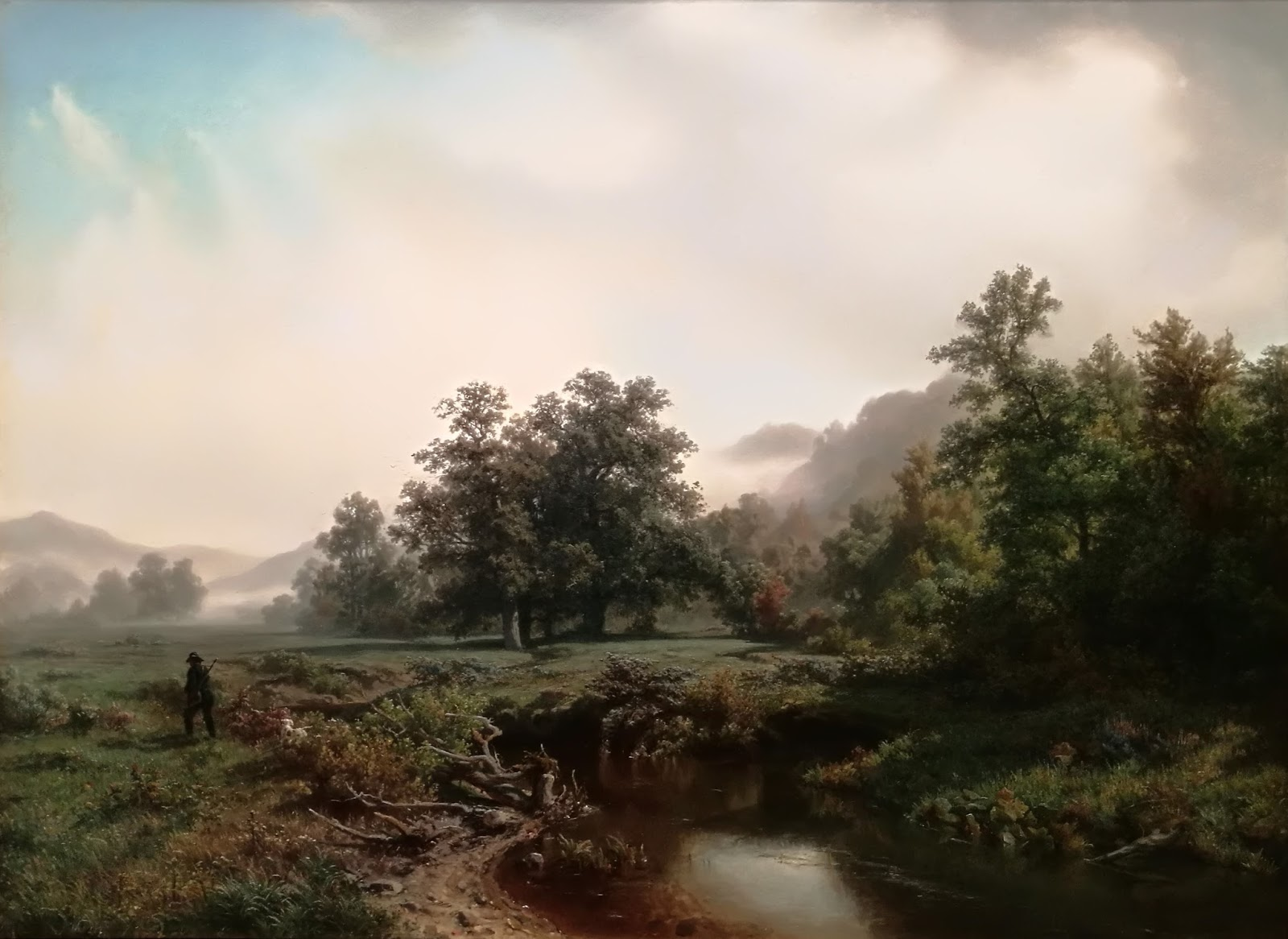
Autumn Morning, 1856

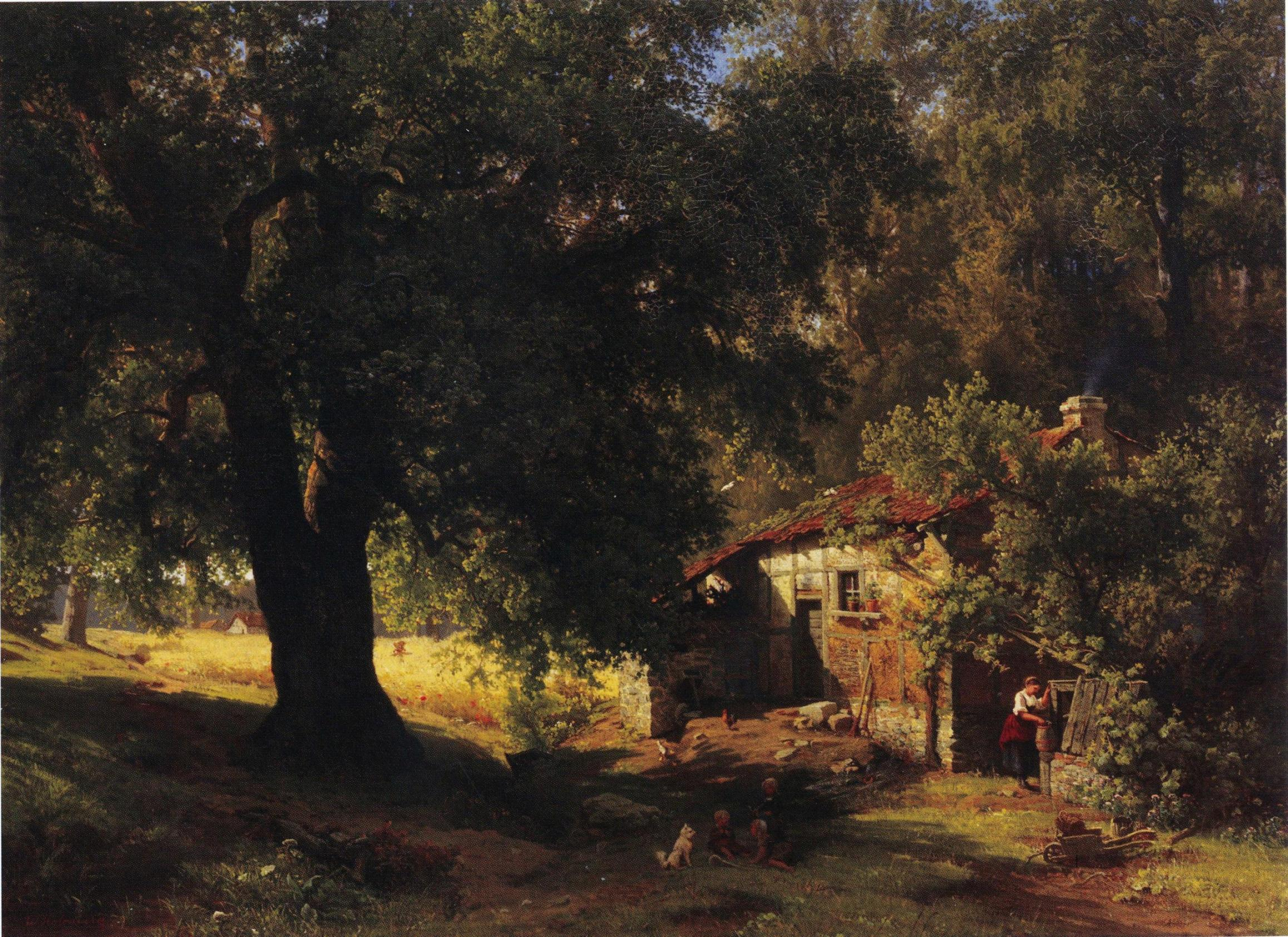
German Farmhouse, 1857

Poplar Alley, 1857

=== After the study at Düsseldorf ===
In 1857, after four years of being away, he returned to Finland, spending time with relatives. In the summer of 1858 he spent time in Norway and married Norwegian Anna Glad (1834–1909), a painter and daughter of the commander of Akershus Fortress, Christian Glad. Gude also spent some time with Holmberg in Norway, painting watercolor sketches together near Christiania. Holmberg had settled to live in Düsseldorf where he spent the winter with Anna. They visited Finland in the summer of 1859 and spent time in Kuru.

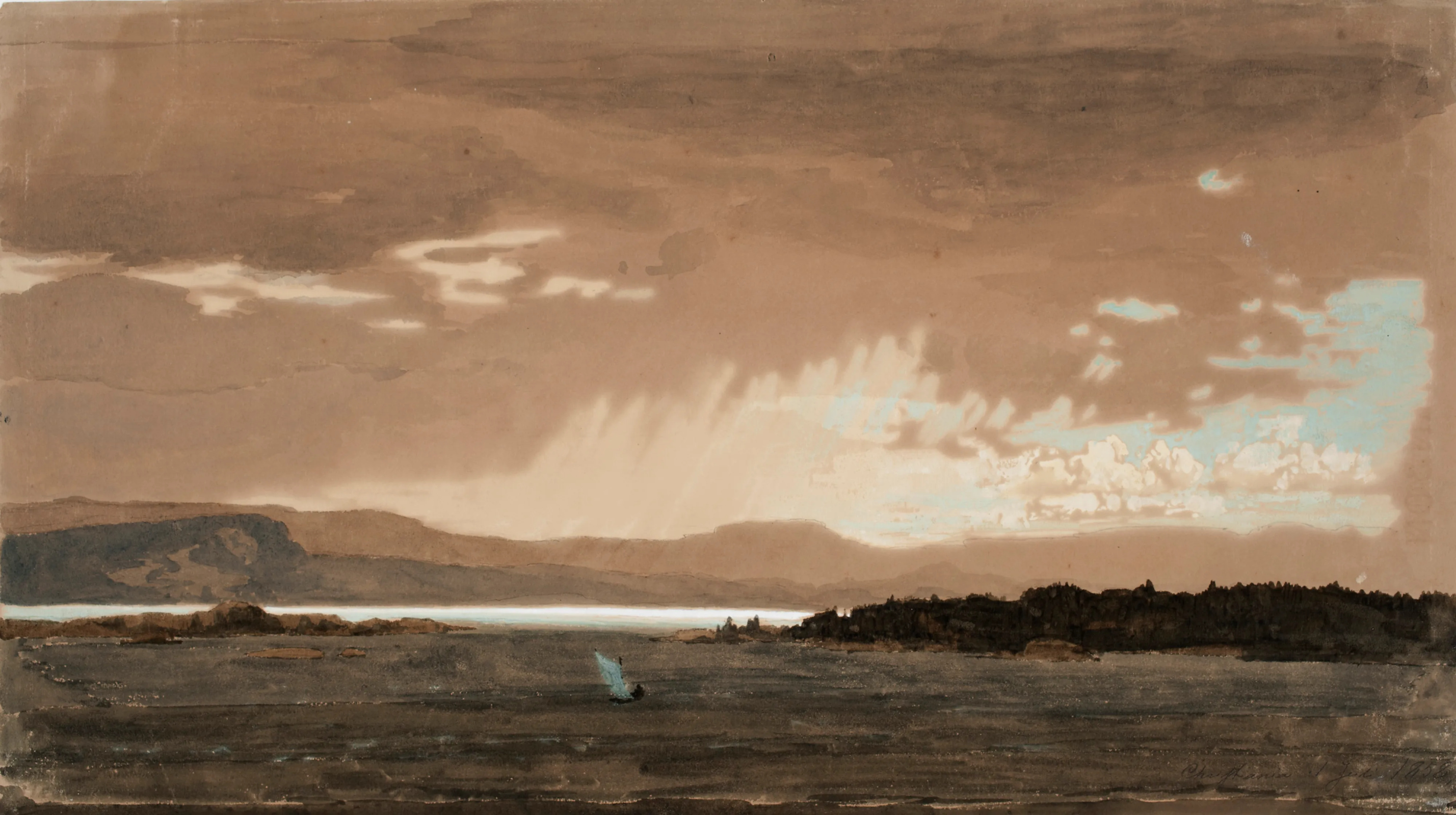
Rain at a Fjord Near Kristiania, 1858, watercolor

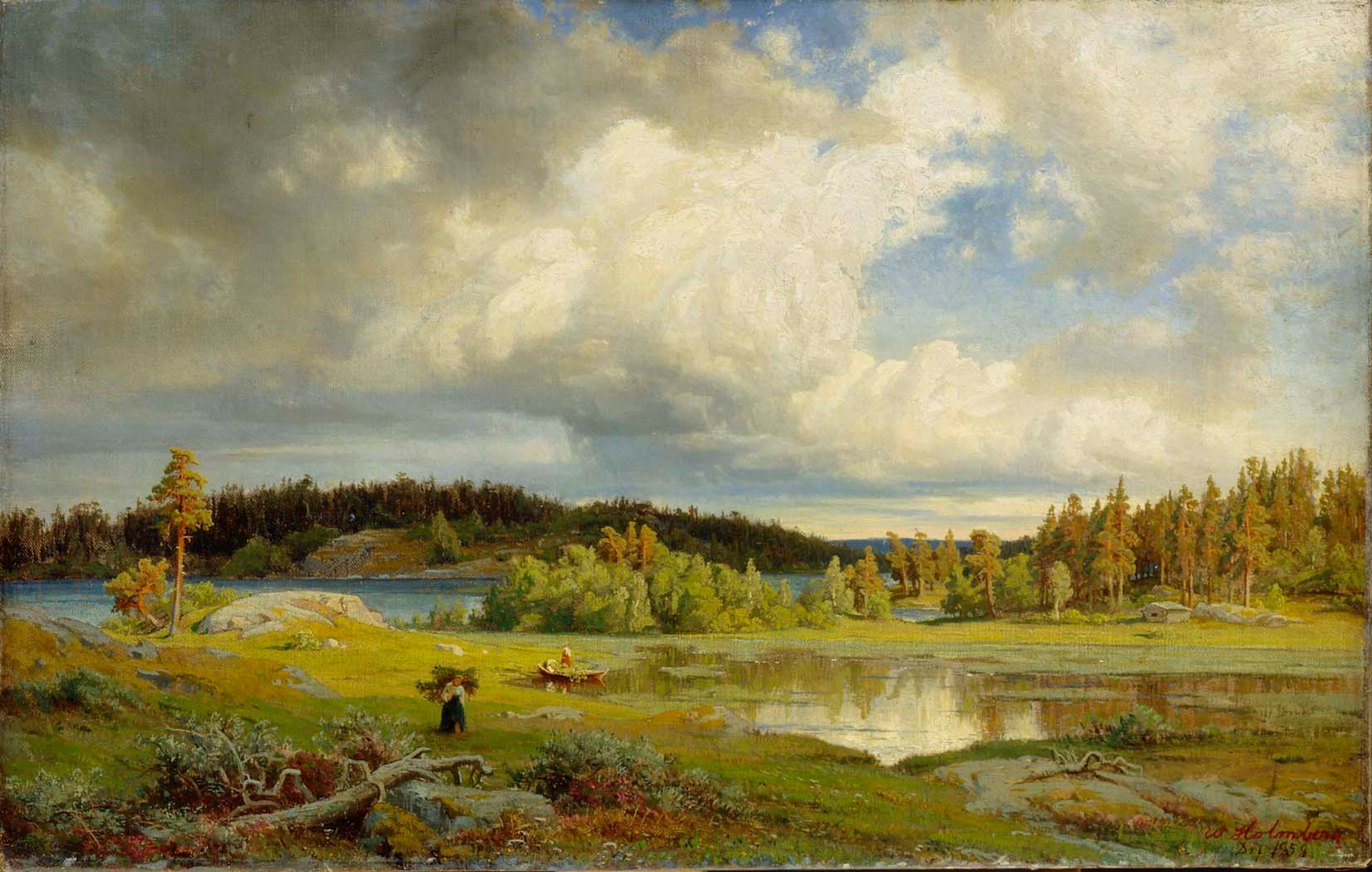
Landscape from Kuru in Morning Light, 1858

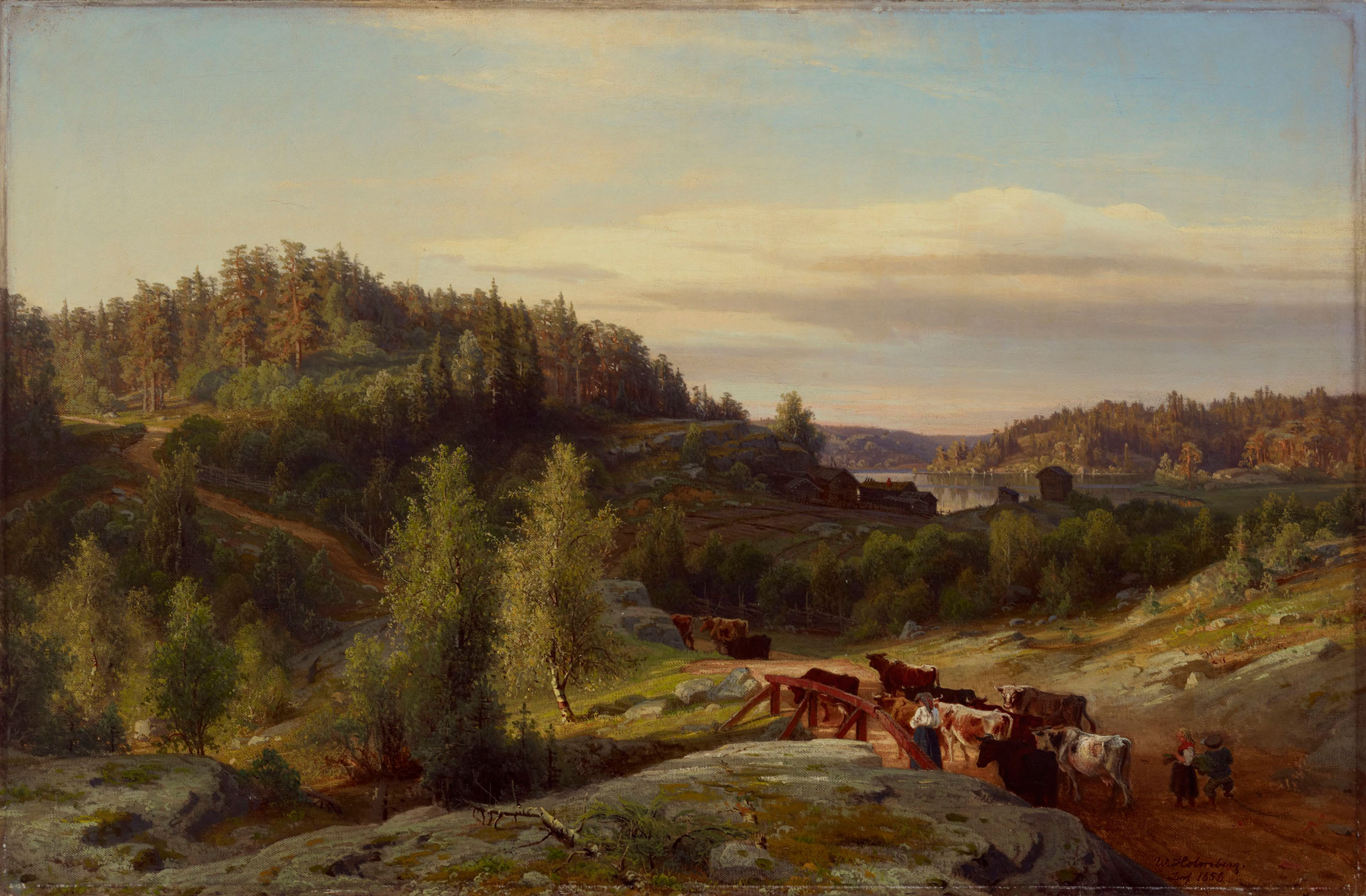
Landscape from Kuru in Evening Light, 1858

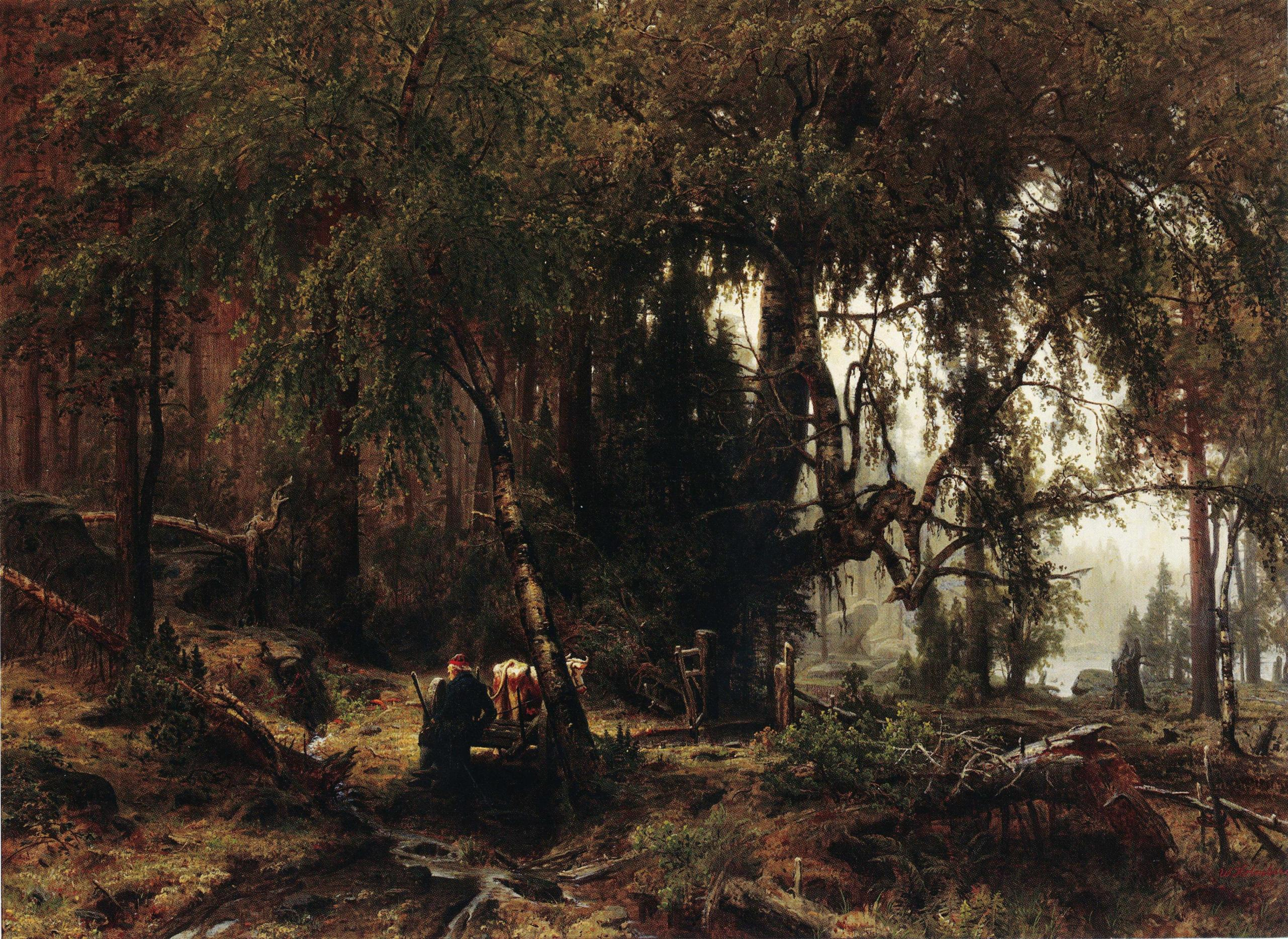
Forest in Rainy Weather, 1859

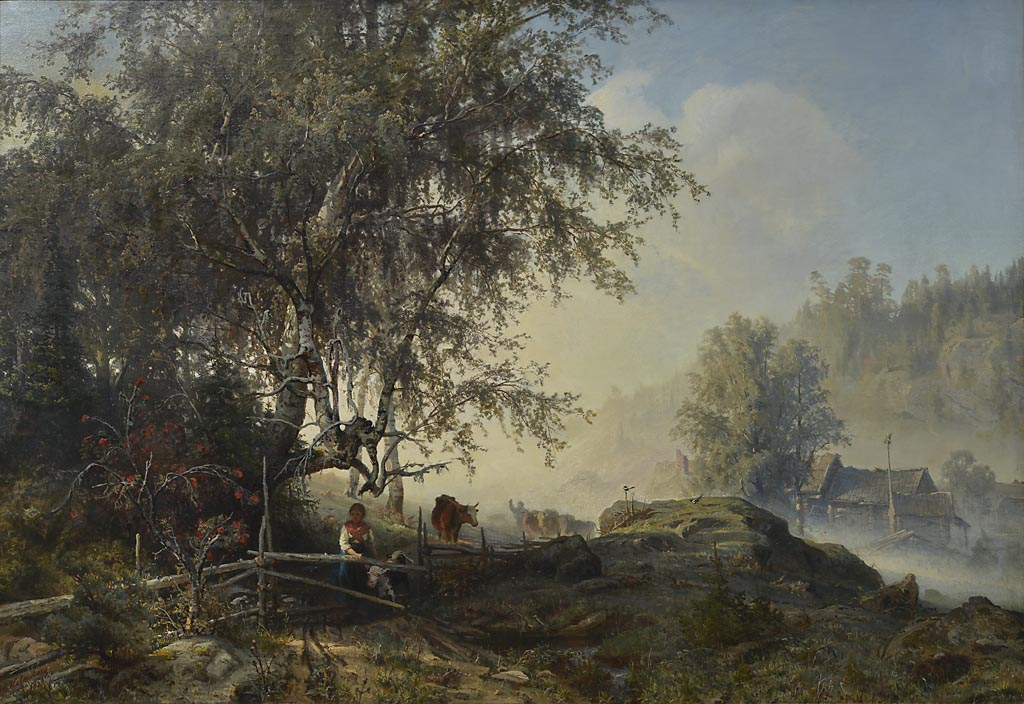
Autumn Morning in Ringerike, 1859

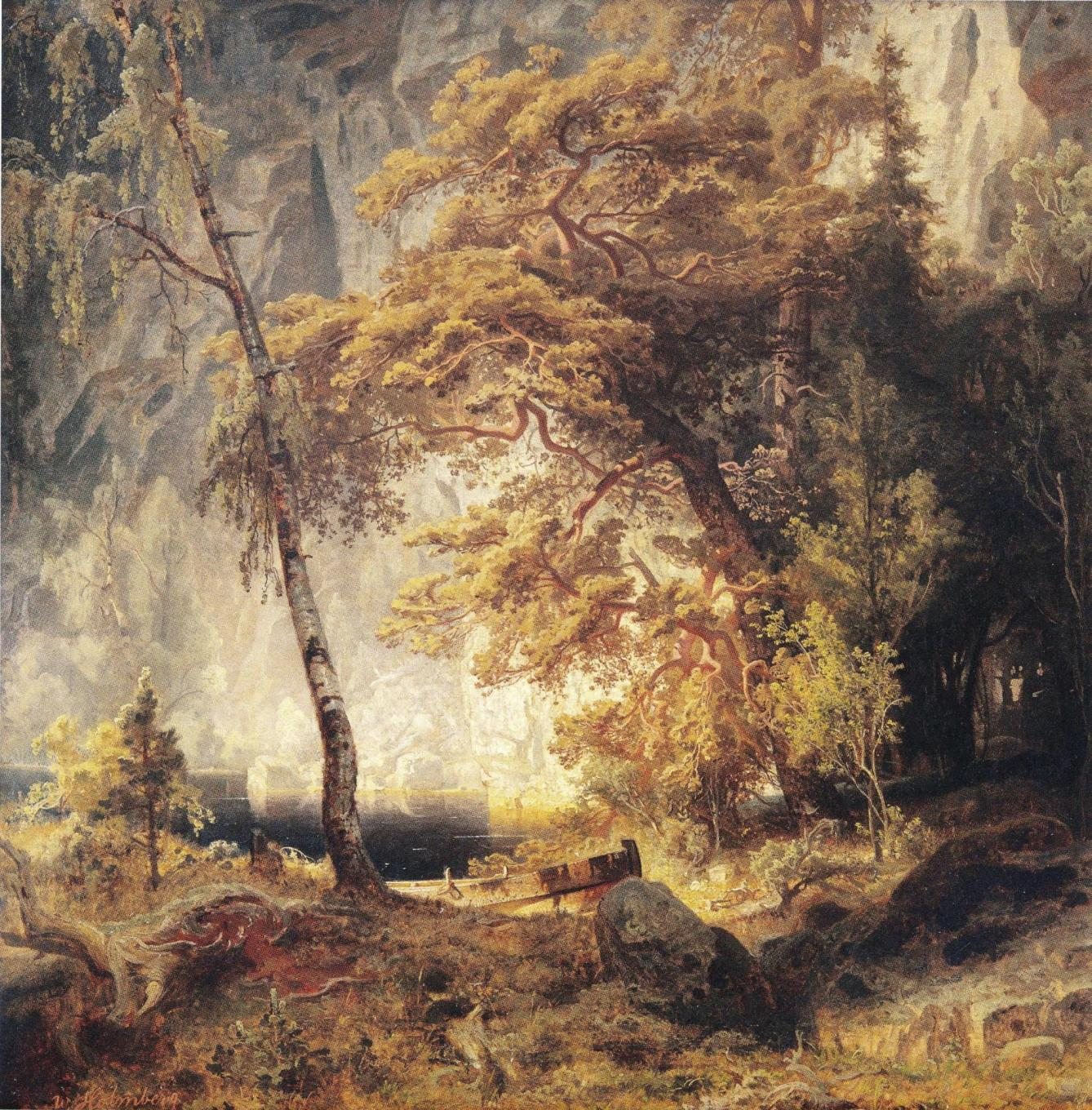
A Motif from Toriseva, 1859

=== Death ===
But by early 1860 he was having considerable difficulties with his lungs, relating to tuberculosis that he had already struggled with for years. In the spring they had a daughter, Betzy (who later became a composer) but the couple also ran into some financial troubles as they had a harder time selling paintings. The situation looked brighter again when he was invited to be a professor of landscape art in a new art school in Weimar. However, the invitation was cancelled and Werner was now bedridden with his sickness. As he died in September, many of his paintings were left unfinished. One of his sisters and an older brother had also died from the same sickness.

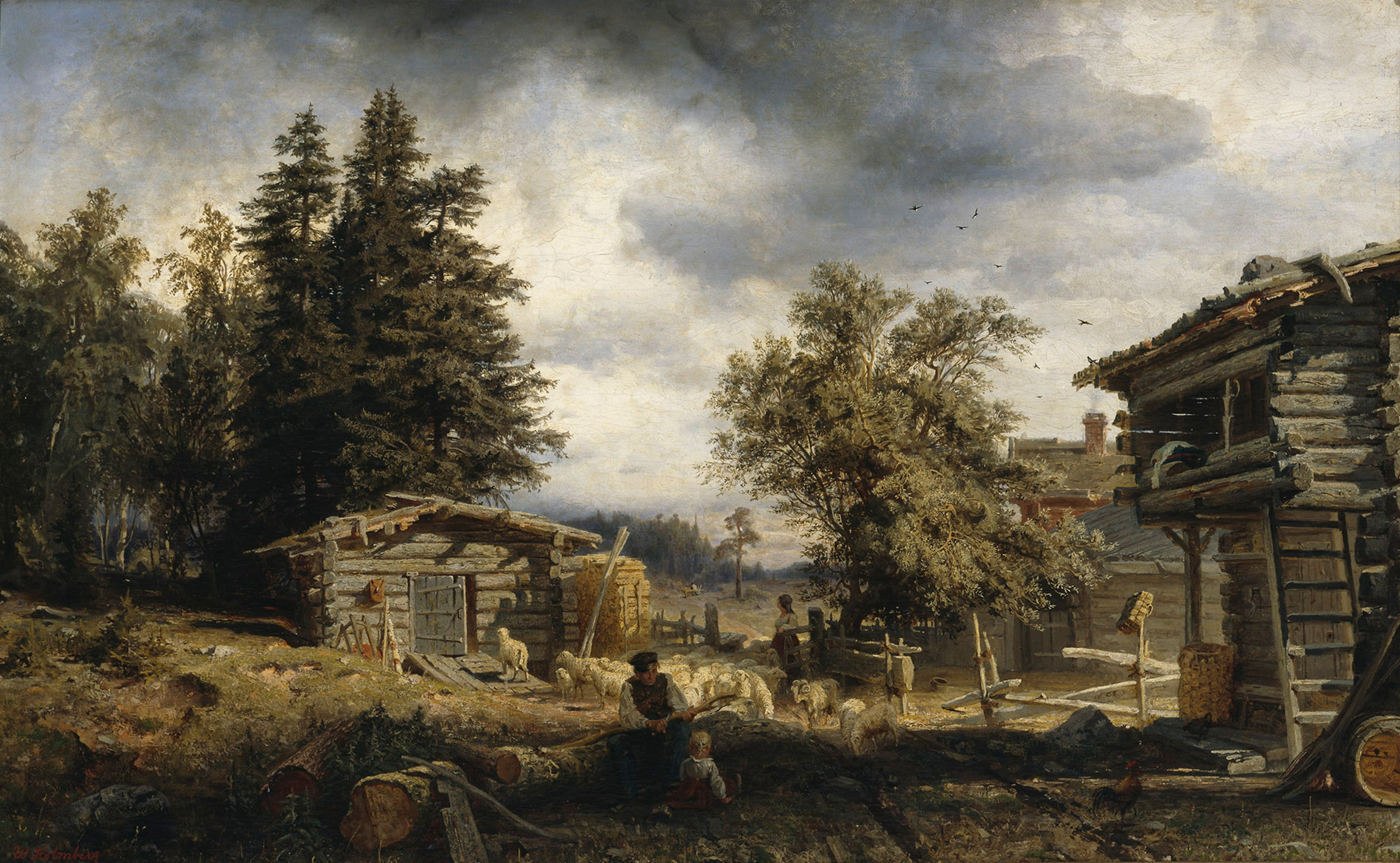
Cottage in Kuru, 1859

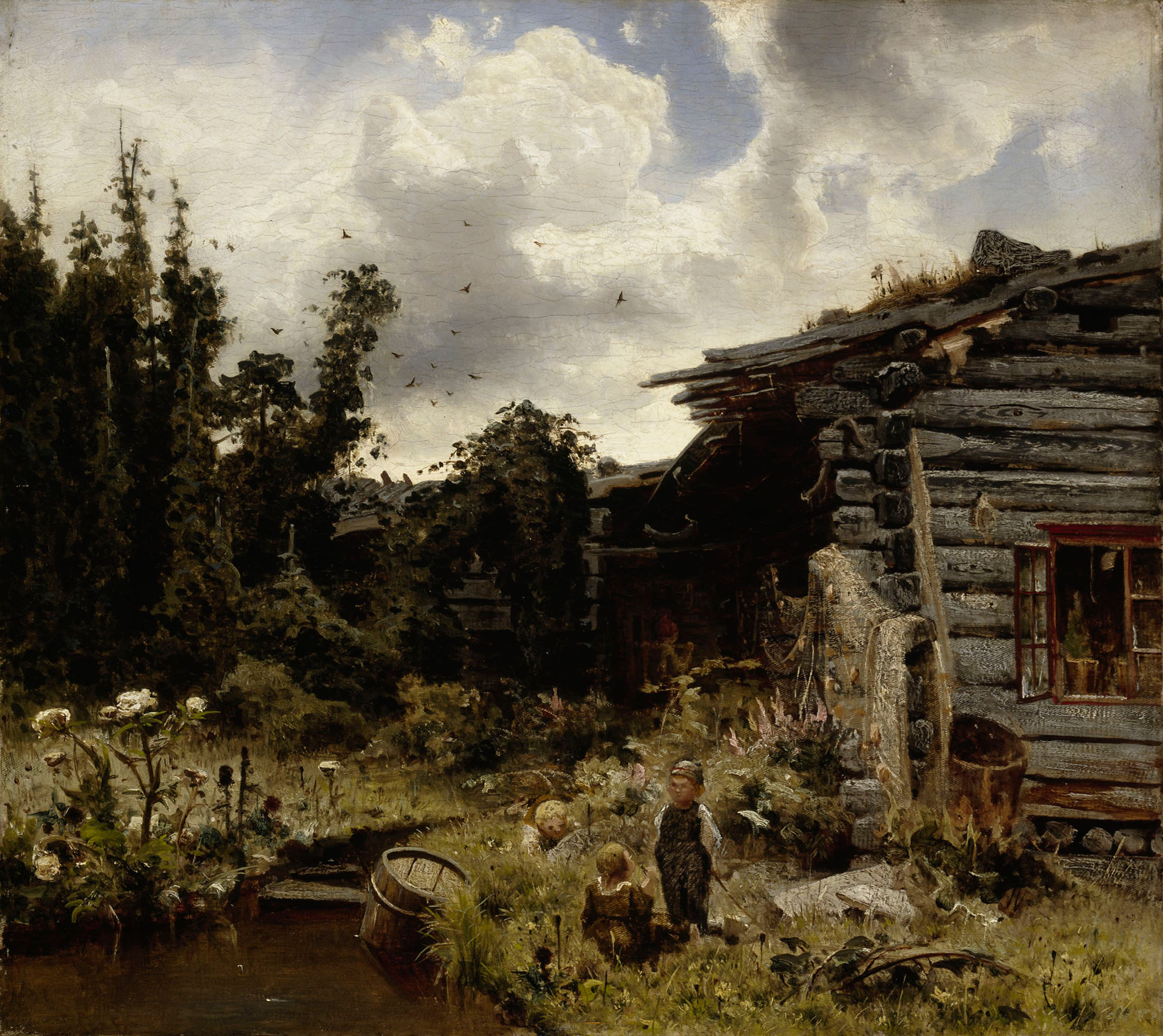
Finnish Hop Garden, 1860

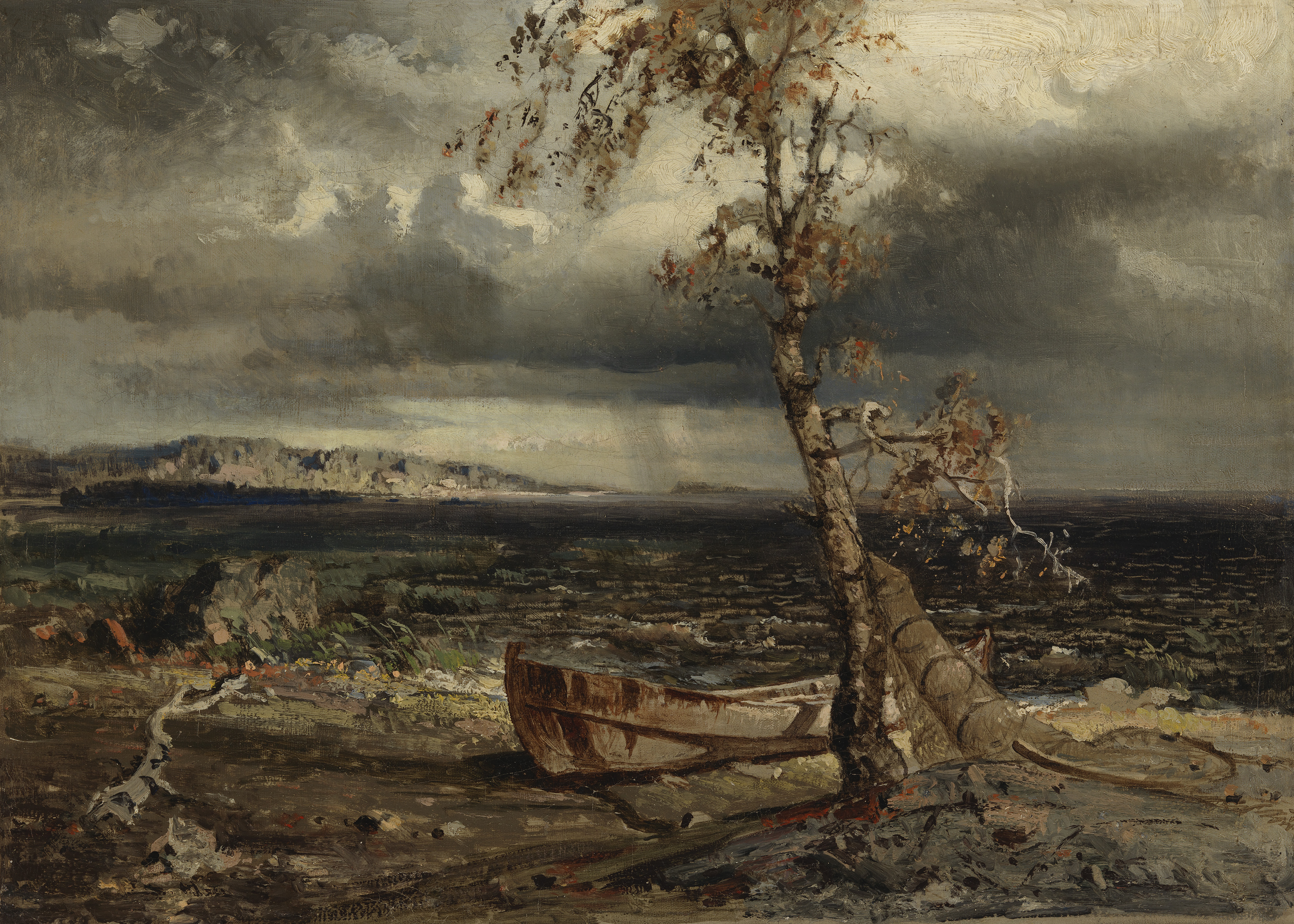
Storm on Lake Näsijärvi, 1860

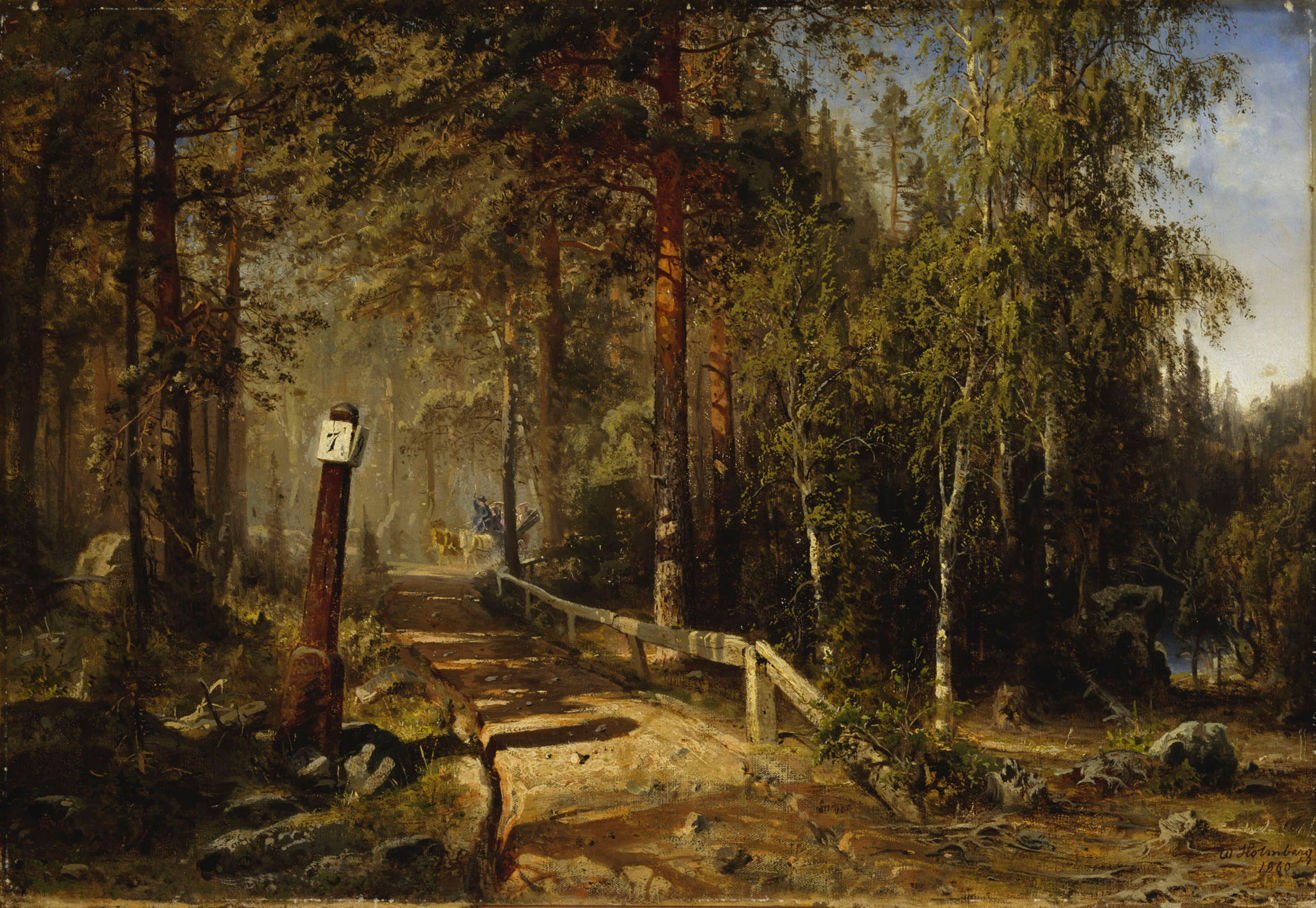
Mail Road in Häme, 1860

Road in Häme (A Hot Summer Day), 1860

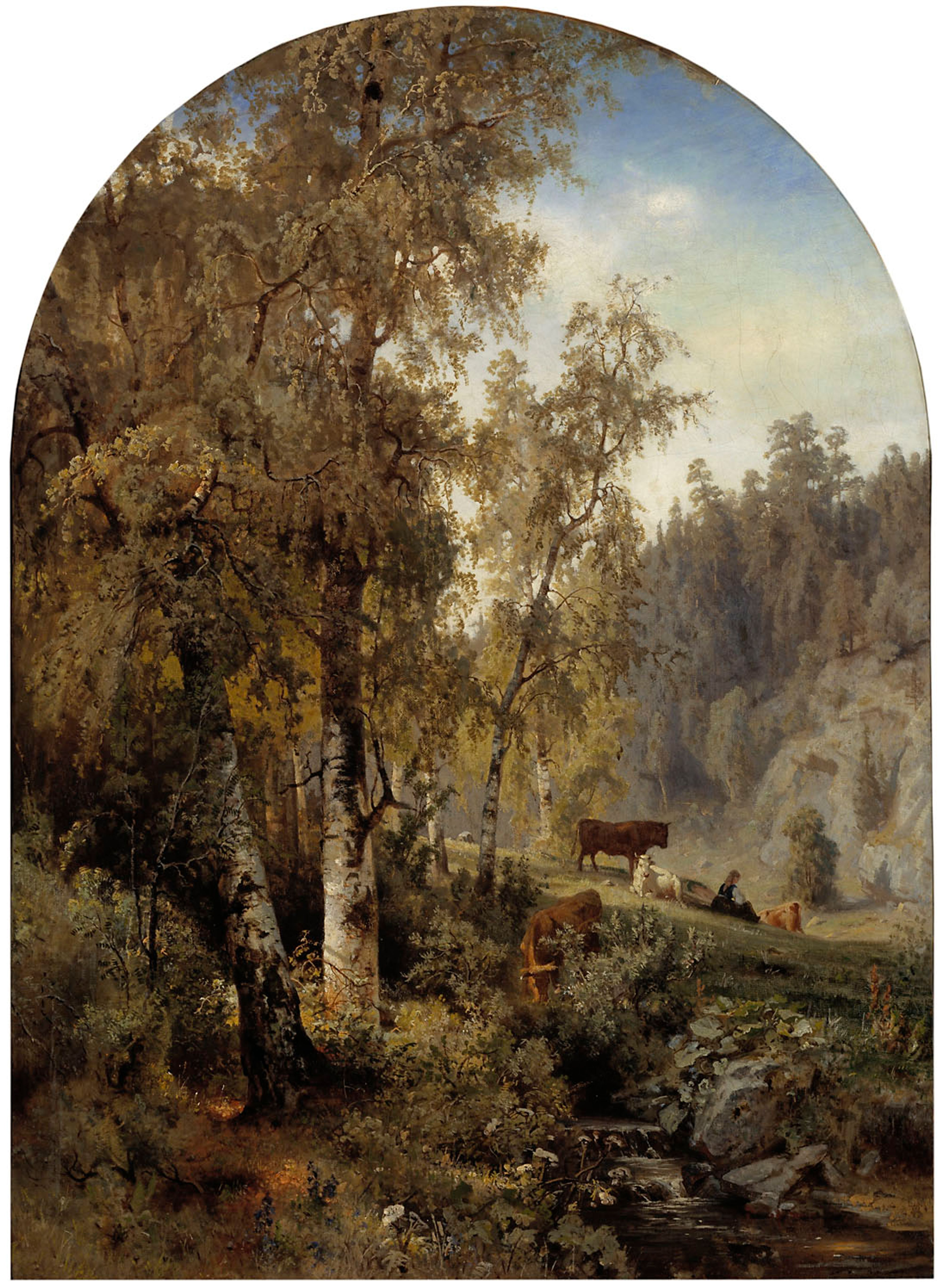
Ideal Landscape, 1860, his last painting with slight final touches by Hans Gude

== Legacy ==
Holmberg is the first Finnish painter to have received international recognition. His effect especially to Finnish landscape painting was large.

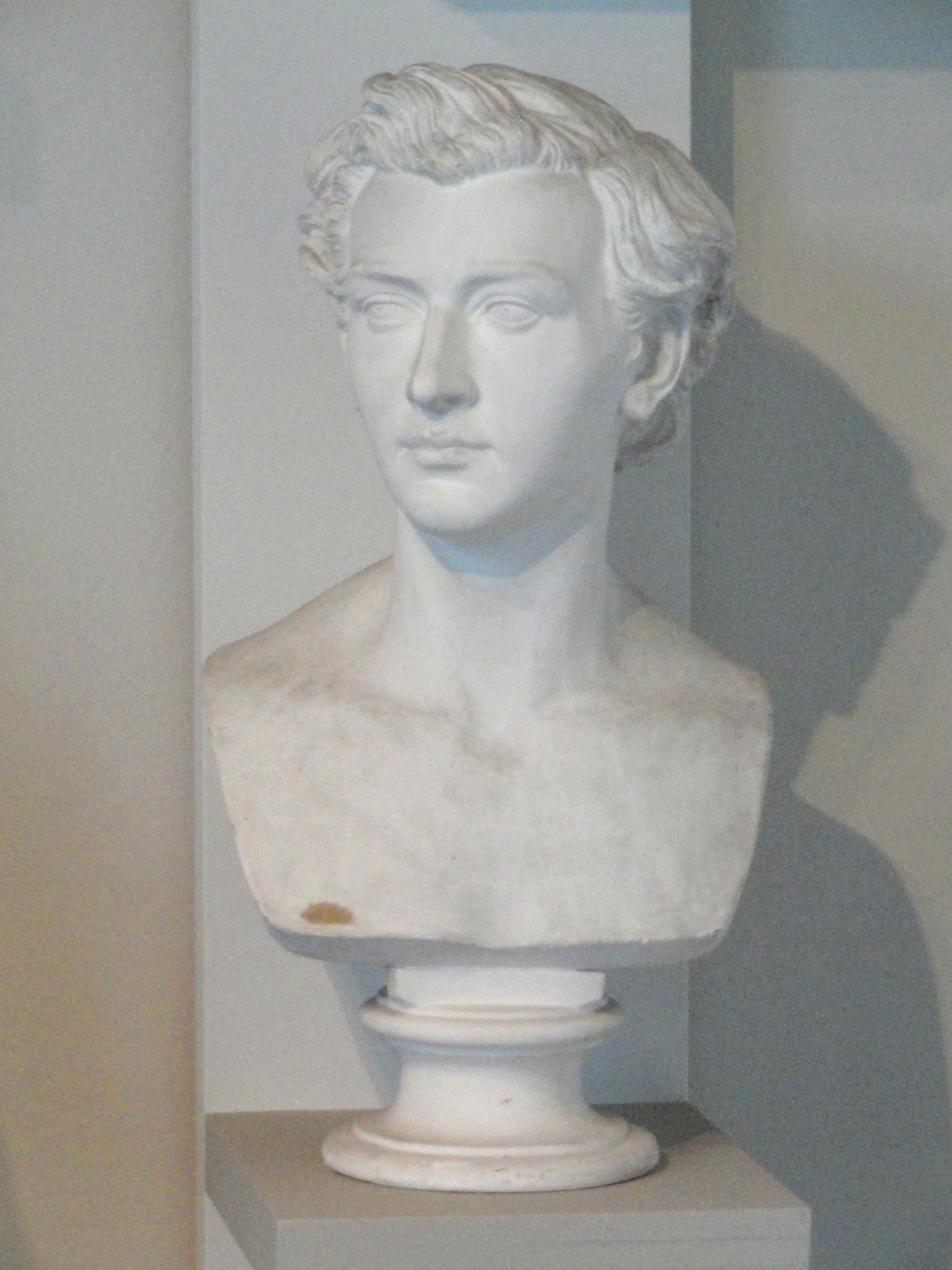
Bust by Walter Runeberg, 1862

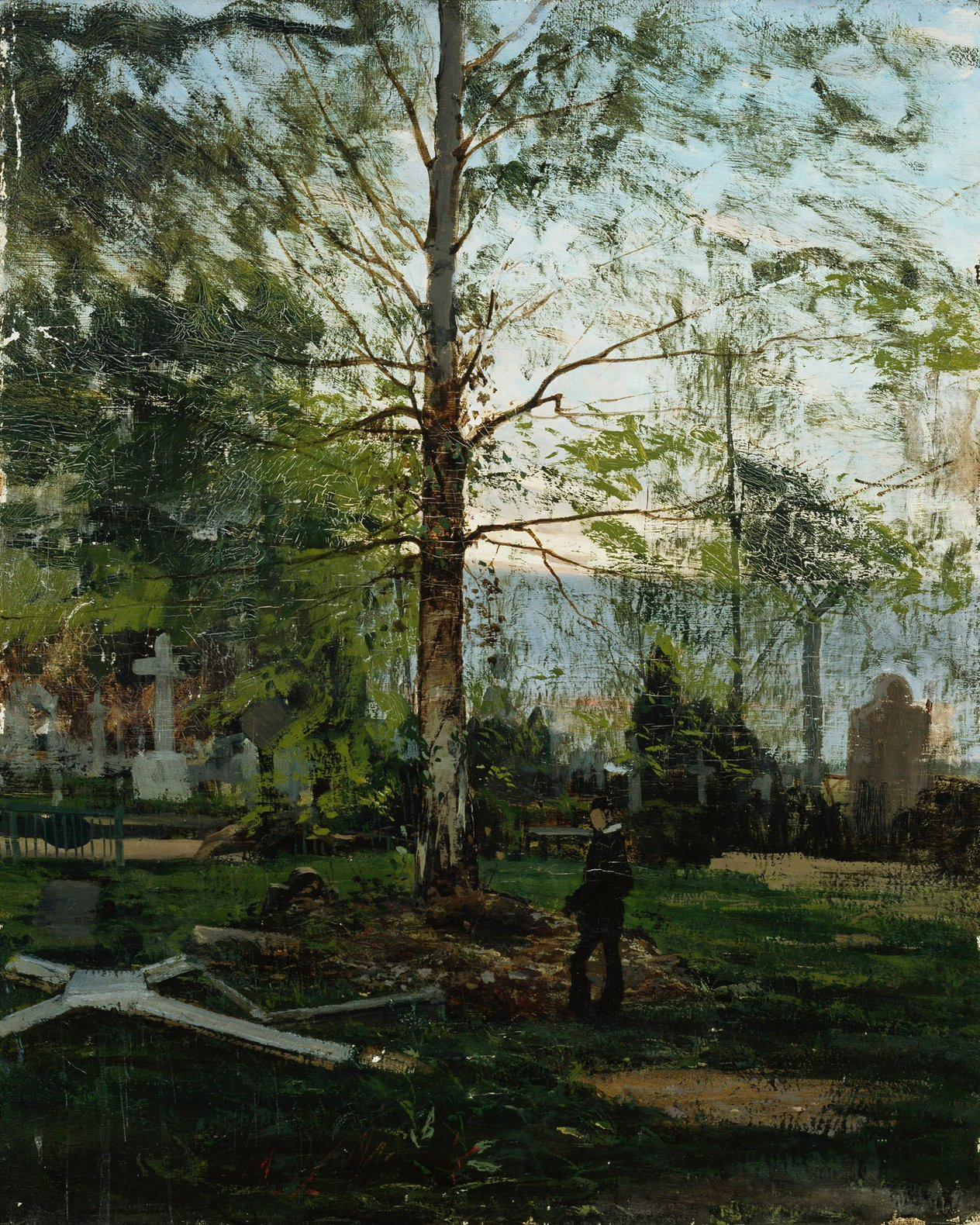
Werner Holmberg's Graveside, Victor Westerholm, 1882

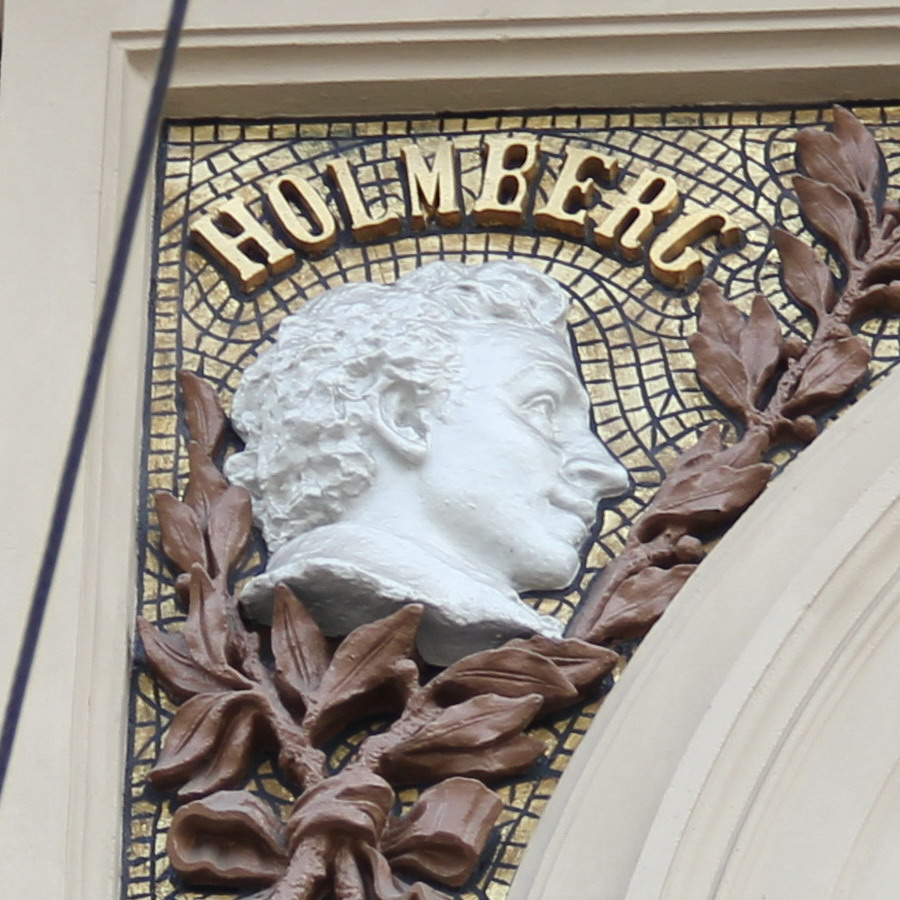
Medallion of Holmberg on the facade of Ateneum by Ville Vallgren, 1887

== See also ==
- Finnish art
