= Riitta Vainionpää =

Swedish textile artist (1952–2021)

- Riitta Vainionpää in 2014
- Born: 3 October 1952; Muuruvesi, Finland
- Died: 24 April 2021 (aged 68); Stockholm, Sweden
- Occupation: Textile artist

Riitta Maija Vainionpää (3 October 1952 – 24 April 2021) was a Finnish-Swedish textile artist.

== Biography ==
Vainionpää has been awarded several scholarships and was chosen Artist of the Year 2011 by the Swedish-Finnish art association Suomiart.

Vainionpää's work has been displayed in galleries throughout Sweden, in exhibitions such as "Då och nu" (English: "Then and Now") at Liljevalchs konsthall in 2011, and "Nu får det vara nog" (English: "Enough is enough") at the Röhsska Museum in 2015/2016.

Vainionpää died on 24 April 2021, in Stockholm, from COVID-19. She was 68 years old.
