= Road in Häme =

1860 painting by Werner Holmberg

- Maantie Hämeessä (Finnish)
- Artist: Werner Holmberg
- Year: 1860
- Medium: oil on canvas
- Dimensions: 88 cm × 103.5 cm (35 in × 40.7 in)
- Location: Ateneum; Helsinki

Häme road or Hot summer day is the most famous work of Werner Holmberg (1830–1860). It was painted in 1860. Though short, Holmberg's career helped develop Finnish landscape painting. He combined the traditional landscape painting techniques of the atelier with the modern outdoor en plein air landscape.

In the painting, a horse-drawn wagon is travelling along a rolling country road through a pine forest in Tavastia. The painting depicts the carriage from the rear on a hot day. Trees and vegetation are painted with accuracy and the perspective of the image from the fresh wheel marks in the dirt creates an impression of movement. One can almost smell the dust and pine needles under the wheels.

In 1853, Holmberg was the first Finnish artist to study in Düsseldorf. From the surviving sketches, it seems Holmberg's Road in Häme was probably painted in the Tampere region.

== Sources ==
- Anja Olavinen: Werner Holmberg: Maantie Hämeessä (Helteinen kesäpäivä). Teoksessa Ateneum-opas. Toim. Timo Huusko. 2007. s. 20.
