= Elk's Head of Huittinen =

Mesolithic figurine

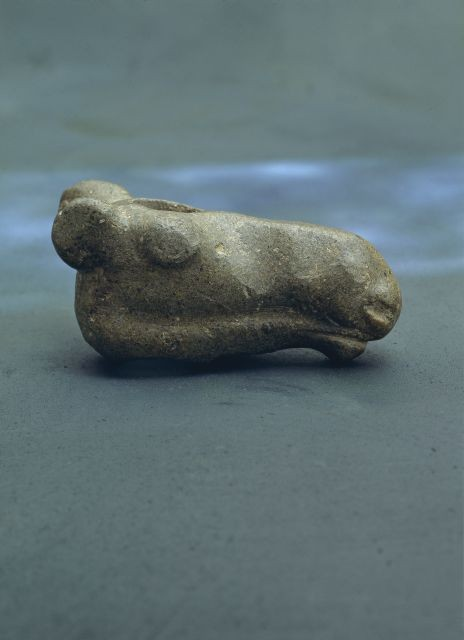
- Material: Soapstone
- Size: Length: c. 10 cm
- Created: c. 6,500 BC
- Discovered: 1903; Finland
- Present location: Helsinki, Uusimaa, Finland

Elk's Head of Huittinen (Finnish: Huittisten hirvenpää, also known as Moose's Head) is a Mesolithic moose head figurine of soapstone found in 1903 from Huittinen in the province of Satakunta, Finland. The sculpture is dated to between 8,000 and 9,000 years ago. It is placed in the permanent exhibition of National Museum of Finland in Helsinki. Replicas are displayed in the Museum of Huittinen and in the sculpture collection of University of Helsinki. Elk's Head is most likely the best-known archaeological artifact in Finland.

== Discovery ==
The Elk's Head is the oldest stone sculpture found in Finland. It was discovered in 1903 by a farm worker in a potato field in the village of Palojoki near Huittinen. A year later, the figurine was sold on a market in Turku. It was placed in the collection of a local historical museum and eventually came into the possession of the Finnish National Museum.

== Description ==
The c. 10 centimeter long figurine is made of soapstone which is not found in Western Finland. The sculpture, or at least its material is probably imported from the eastern parts of the country. Elk's Head has a hole for mounting a rod so it was most likely used as a sceptre in a ritual context.

== See also ==
- List of Stone Age art
