= Suomiart =

Finnish art association

Suomiart is the art association of Finnish Artists in Sweden. Established in 1977, the association has over 100 members.

Suomiart runs art exhibitions, courses, excursions and other cultural events in Sweden. it also participates in international cultural projects. Suomiart also arranges a yearly competition called the Artist of the Year in Sweden. It is open for Swedish Finns as well as Finnish and Swedish-speaking Finns artists who live in Sweden. The artist of the year is chosen by a jury.

== The Artist of the Year Award ==
The Artist of the Year Award Winners
| Year | Award | Winner |
|---|---|---|
| 2019 | Artist of the Year | Pekka Sarnus |
| 2017 | Artist of the Year | Carina Söderström |
| 2015 | Artist of the Year | Titti Hammarling |
| 2013 | Artist of the Year | Linn Henriksson Strååt |
| 2013 | Young Artist of the Year | Markus Laakkonen |
| 2012 | Artist of the Year | Karin Wallin |
| 2012 | Young Artist of the Year | Anna Julkunen |
| 2011 | Artist of the Year | Riitta Vainionpää |
| 2011 | Young Artist of the Year | Virva Hinnemo |
| 2010 | Artist of the Year | Helena Piippo Larsson |
| 2010 | Young Artist of the Year | Anton Wiraeus |
| 2009 | Artist of the Year | Thelma Aulio-Paananen |
| 2008 | Artist of the Year | Mette Muhli |
| 2007 | Artist of the Year | Anne Persson Lucenius |
| 2006 | Artist of the Year | Niklas Mulari |
| 2005 | Artist of the Year | Kaarina Manninen |
| 2004 | Artist of the Year | Aila Manni-Snickars |
