= Golden Age of Finnish Art =

Period in the history of the visual arts in Finland, 1880–1910

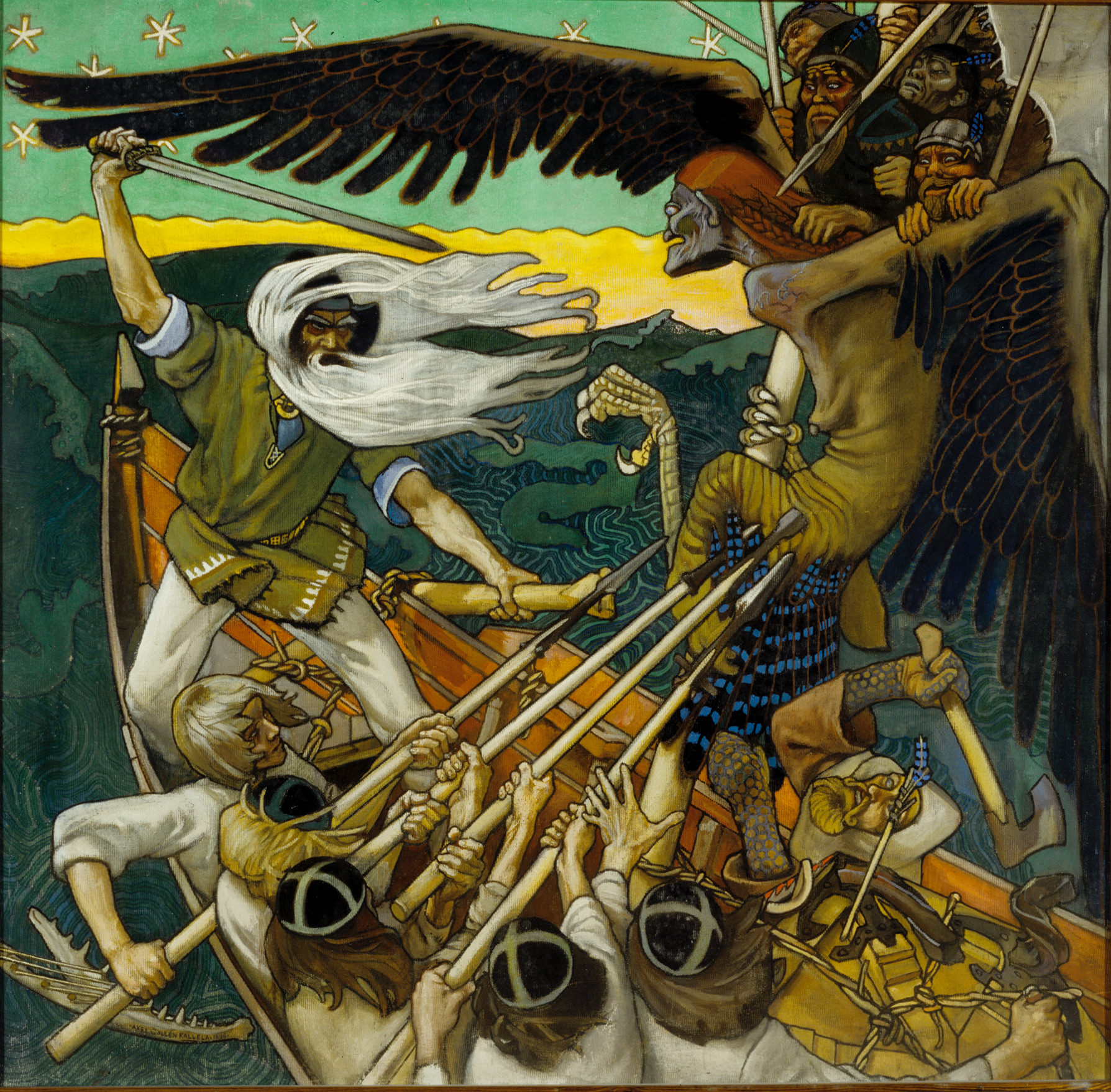
Väinämöinen fights Louhi over the Sampo. Akseli Gallen-Kallela's The Defense of the Sampo, 1896.

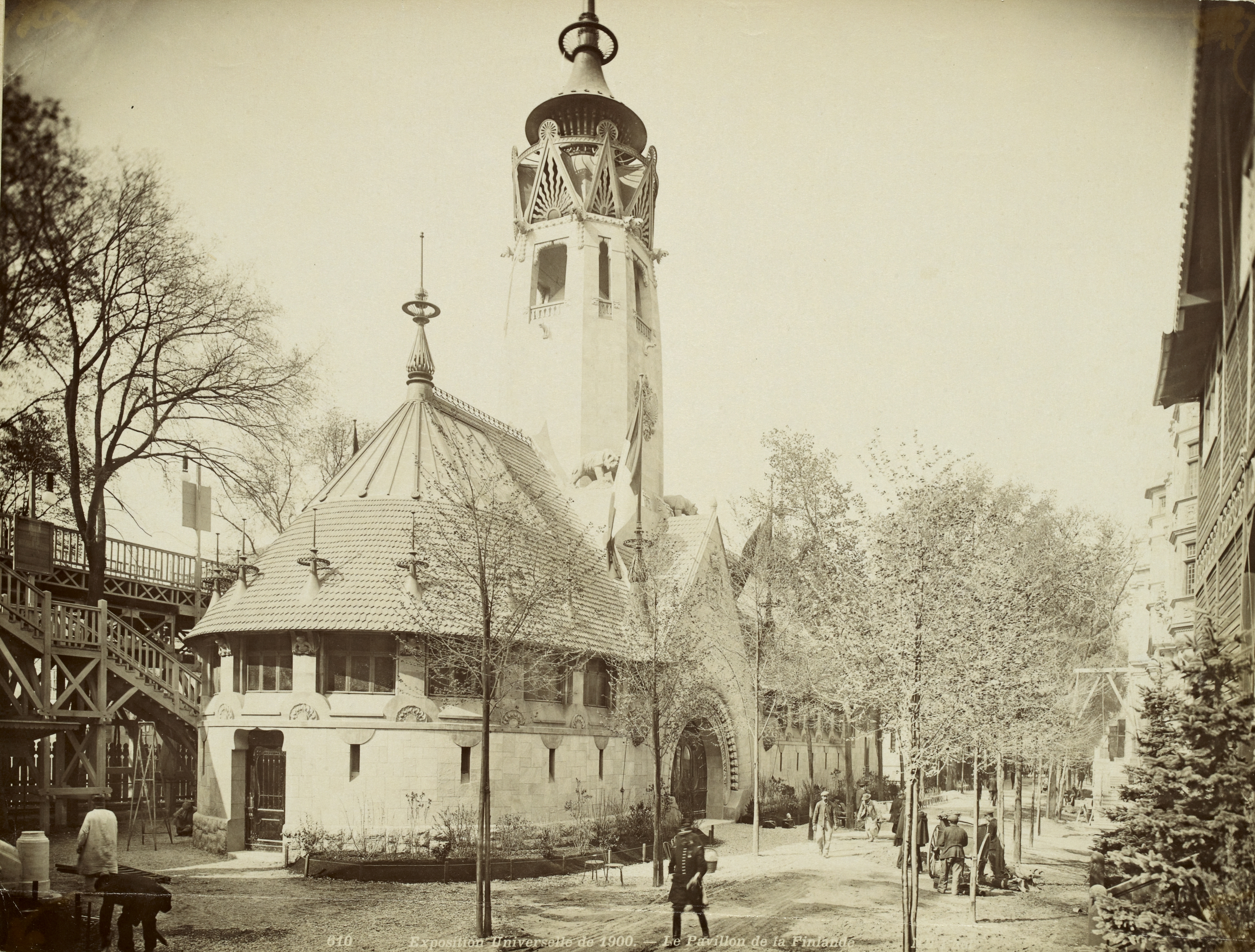
The Finnish Pavilion at the Paris 1900 Expedition by Gesellius, Lindgren, Saarinen (fi)

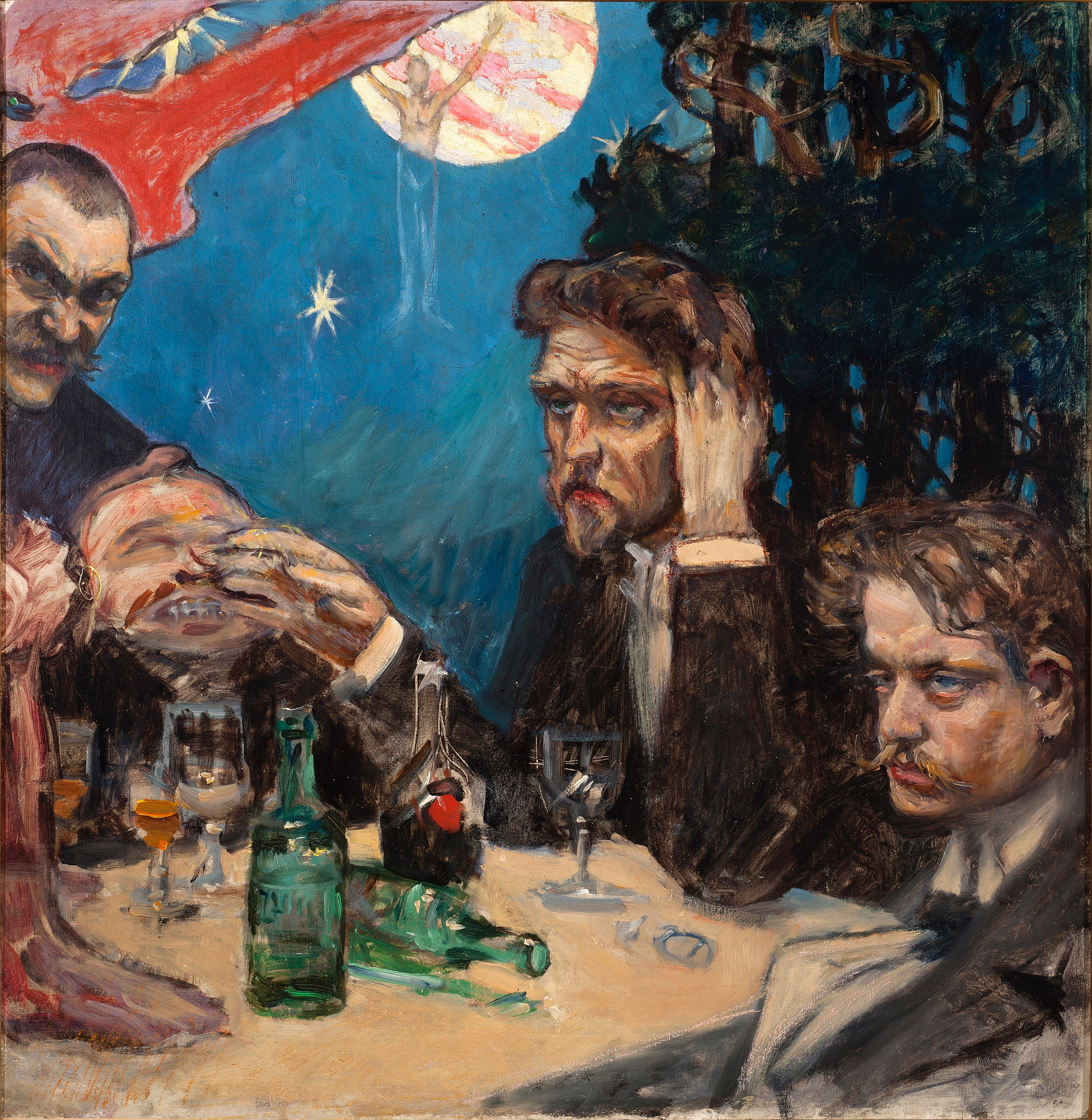
Problem (Symposium) depicting Akseli Gallen-Kallela, Oskar Merikanto, Robert Kajanus and Jean Sibelius, painted by Gallen-Kallela himself, 1894

The Golden Age of Finnish Art coincided with the national awakening of Finland, during the era of the Grand Duchy of Finland under the Russian Empire. It is believed to span an era from the late 19th Century to the early 20th Century, approximately 1880 to 1910. The epic poetry form known as Kalevala, developed during the 19th Century, provided the artistic inspiration for numerous themes at the time, including in visual arts, literature, music and architecture; however, the "Golden Age of Finnish Art" is generally regarded as referring to the realist and romantic nationalist painters of the time. Notable figures of the time include Akseli Gallen-Kallela, Pekka Halonen, Albert Edelfelt, Jean Sibelius, Eino Leino, Helene Schjerfbeck, Emil Wikström, Eero Järnefelt and Eliel Saarinen.

Finnish art became more widely known in Europe at the Paris Exposition of 1900, where the Finnish pavilion was one of the most popular among the attendees.

== Artists ==
There were a number of notable visual artists who are considered to have been part of the Golden Age of Finnish Art.

=== Painters ===
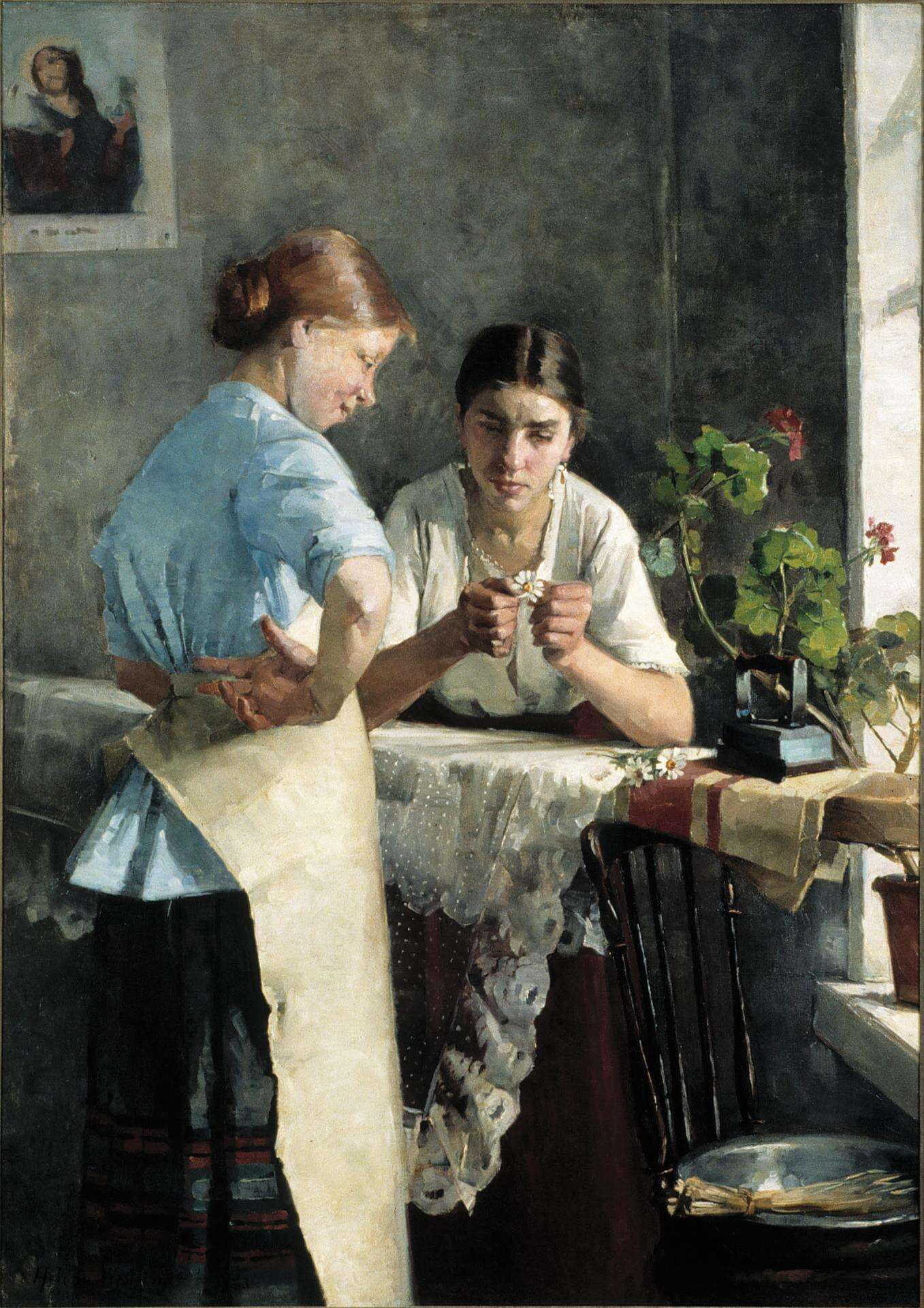
Ironesses, Helena Westermarck, 1883

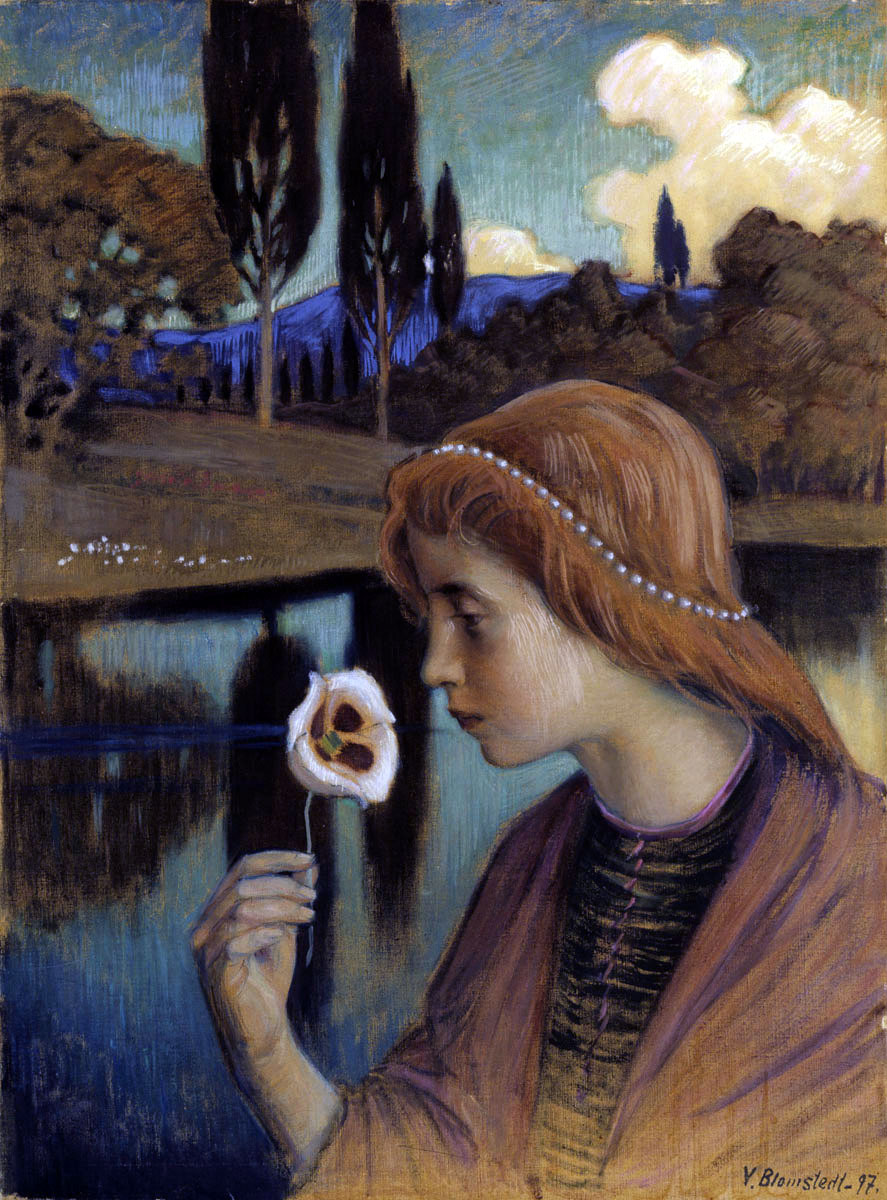
Francesca (fi), Väinö Blomstedt, 1897

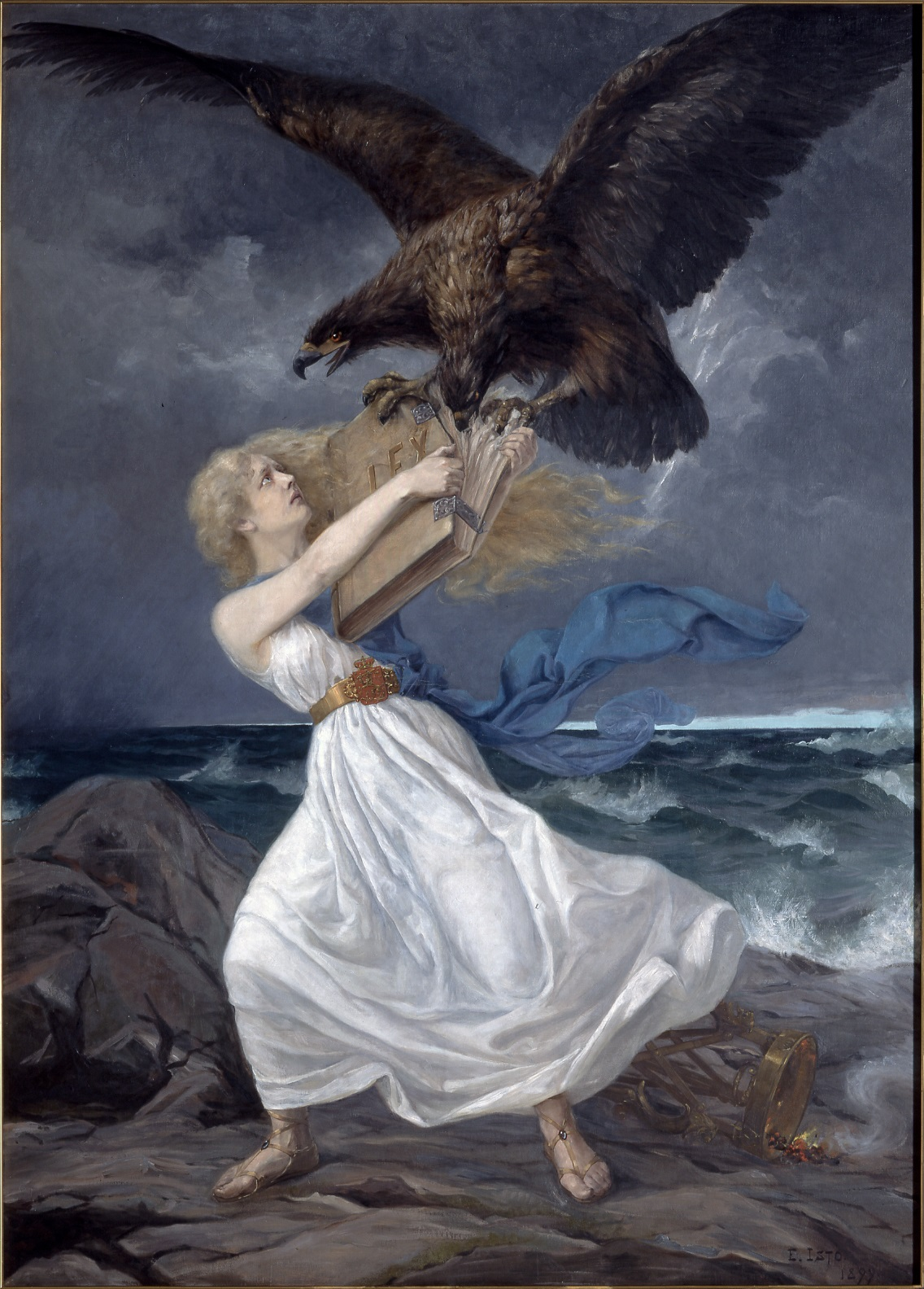
The Attack (fi), Edvard Isto, 1899

The following list of painters does not include artists who are sometimes considered to be part of the Golden Age but generally largely predate it; several notable painters, such as Werner Holmberg, exist in this category. Ferdinand von Wright, the notable Finnish artist whose 1886 The Fighting Capercaillies is considered a seminal Finnish painting, is also regarded as predating the Golden Age. The numerous painters of the Düsseldorf school of painting, such as Berndt Lindholm, Hjalmar Munsterhjelm and Fanny Churberg, may be regarded as Golden Age painters; however, their work is generally associated with an earlier era of artistic development.

Adolf von Becker, however, is regarded as a significant figure to the Golden Age, resulting from his education and tutelage of numerous artists of the era; in addition, Robert Wilhelm Ekman, as an early and notable painter of Kalevala, laid the foundation for similar following works.

Notable Golden Age painters
Artist	Notable work
Amélie Lundahl (1850–1914)	Breton Girl Holding a Jar, 1884 (fi)
Maria Wiik (1853–1928)	Out into the World, 1889
Albert Edelfelt (1854–1905)	Conveying a Child's Coffin, 1879
Gunnar Berndtson (1854–1895)	The Bride's Song, 1893 (fi)
Anna Sahlstén (1859–1931)	Bread Worries, 1895
Victor Westerholm (1860–1919)	Eckerö Post Quay, 1885 (fi)
Elin Danielson-Gambogi (1861–1919)	Mother, 1893
Helene Schjerfbeck (1862–1946)	The Convalescent, 1888
Venny Soldan-Brofeldt (1863–1945)	Antti, 1907
Eero Järnefelt (1863–1937)	Under the Yoke (Burning the Brushwood), 1893
Akseli Gallen-Kallela (1865–1931)	Lemminkäinen's Mother, 1897
Pekka Halonen (1865–1933)	The Mower Men, 1891 (fi)
Ellen Thesleff (1869–1954)	Self-Portrait (fi), 1895
Magnus Enckell (1870–1925)	Resurrection, Tampere Cathedral, 1907
Dora Wahlroos (1870–1947)	By the Wash Basin, 1892
Hugo Simberg (1873–1917)	The Wounded Angel, 1903

=== Sculptors ===
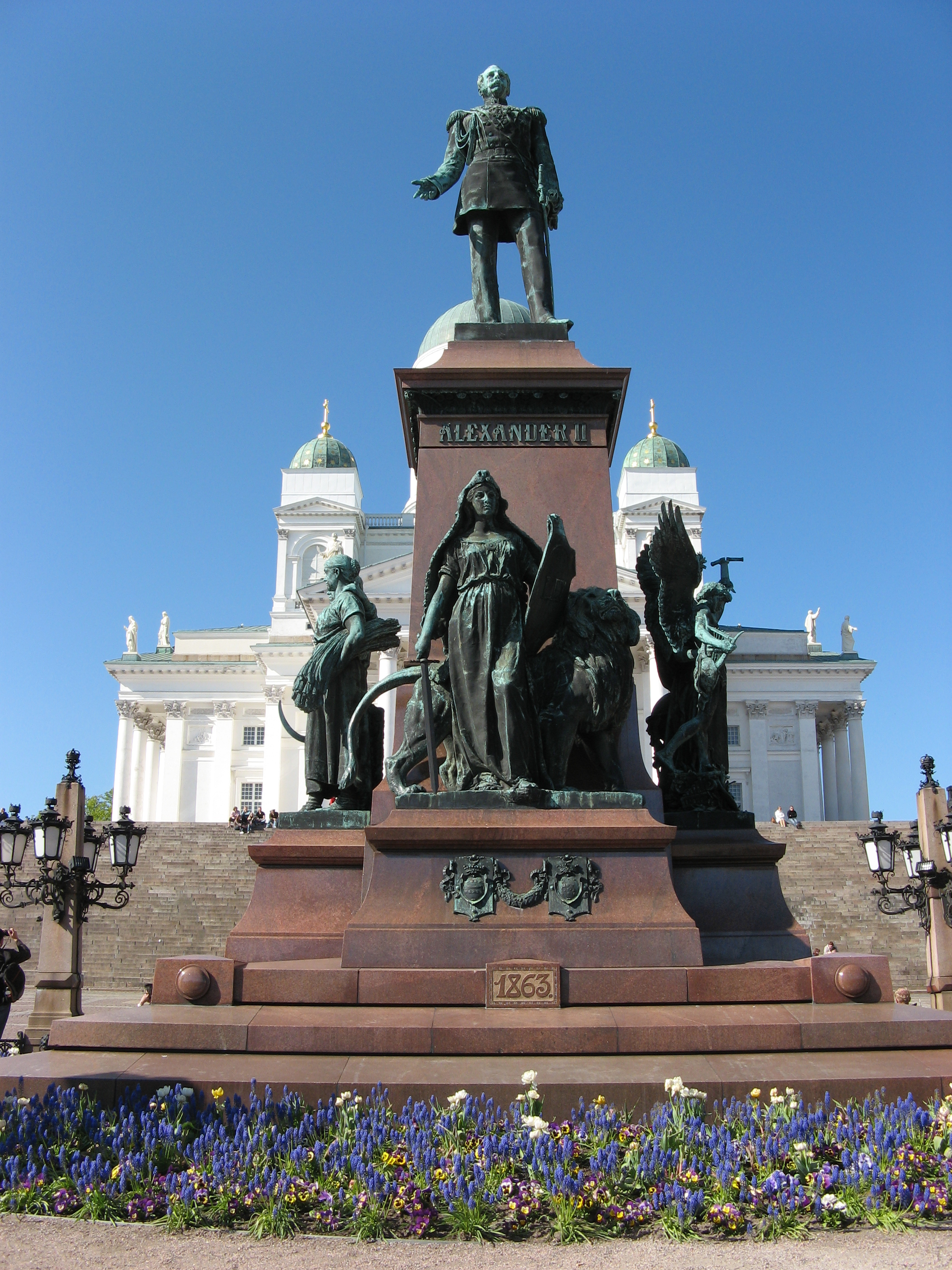
Statue of Alexander II (fi) by Walter Runeberg, 1894

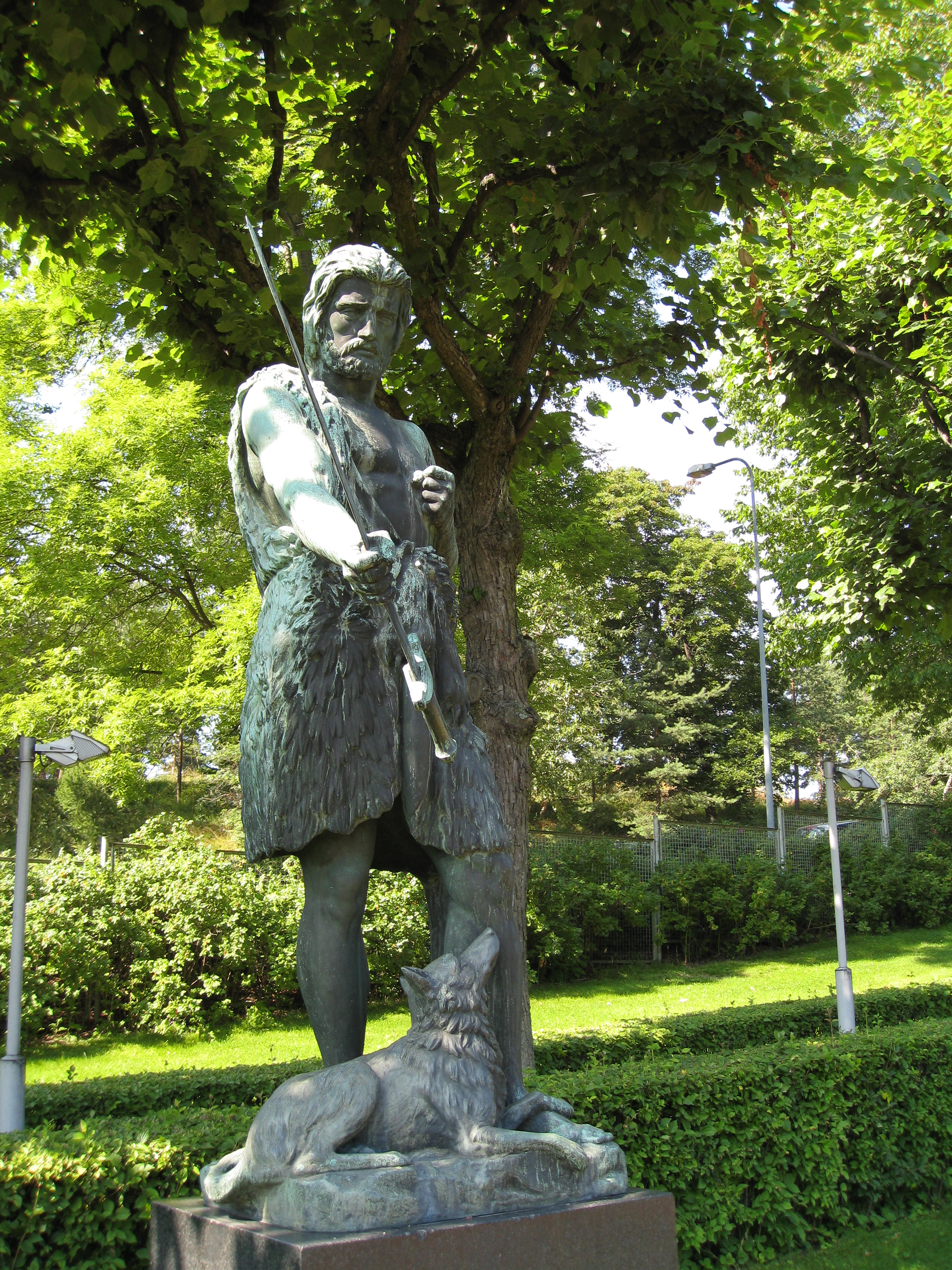
Kullervo Speaks to His Sword by Swedish sculptor Carl Eneas Sjöstrand who lived in Finland for 40 years, 1932 bronze version (original plaster 1868)

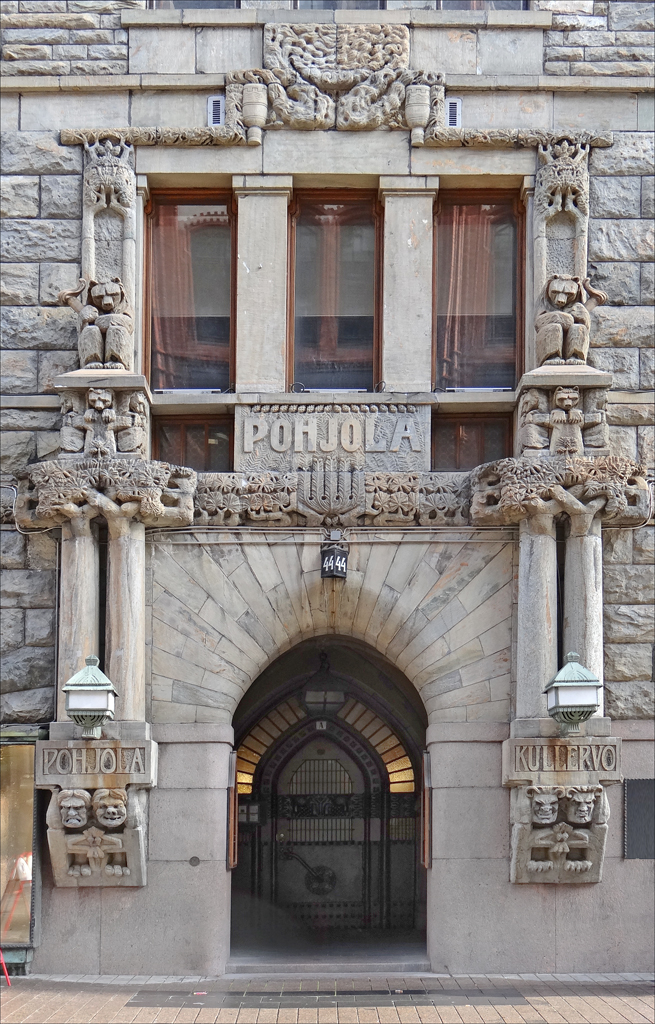
Sculptures on the Pohjola Insurance building by Hilda Flodin, 1901

Notable Golden Age sculptors
Artist	Notable work
Ville Vallgren (1855–1940)	Havis Amanda, 1908
Emil Wikström (1864–1942)	Lantern Carriers, 1914

=== Architects ===
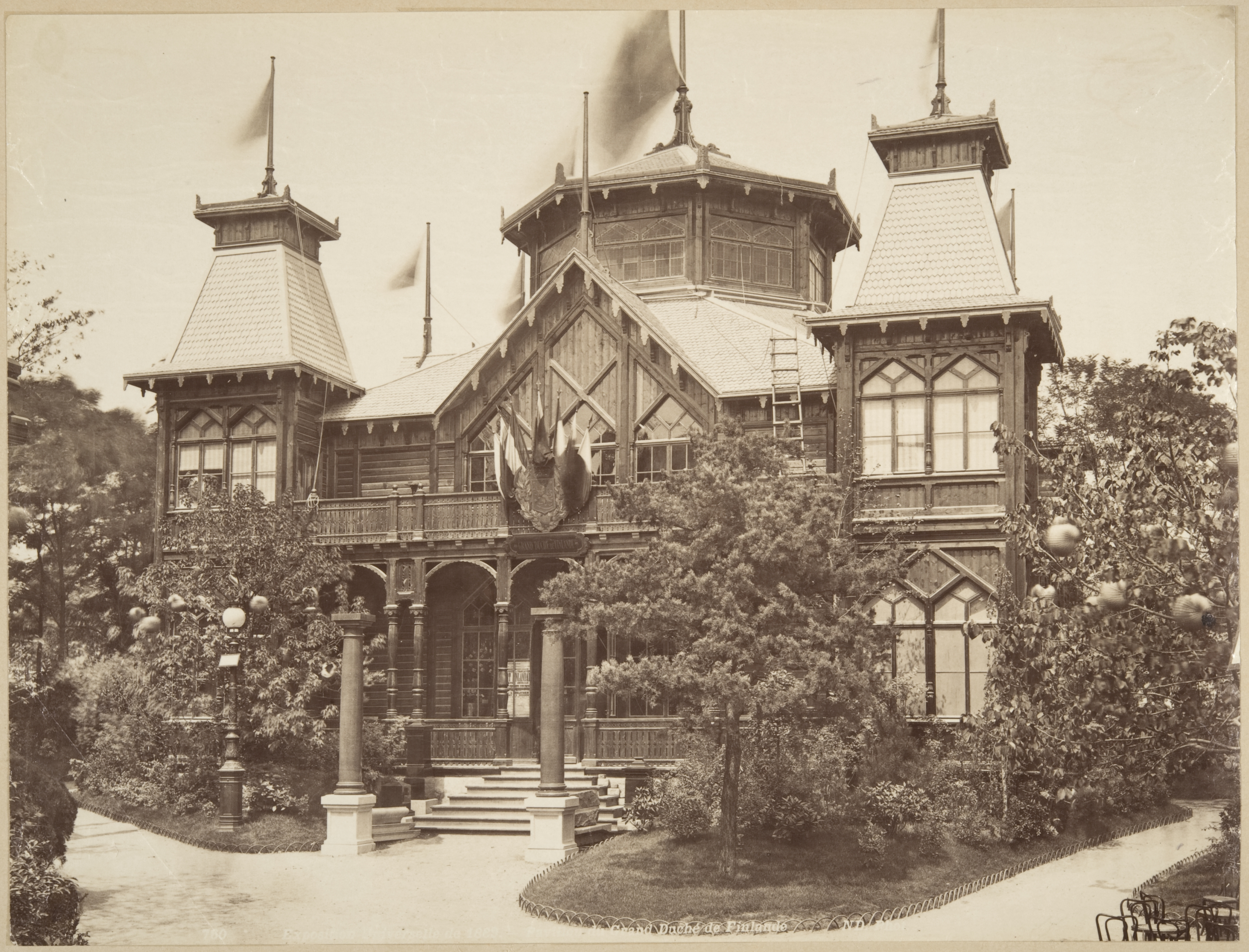
Finnish Pavilion at the Paris 1889 Exposition by Theodor Höijer

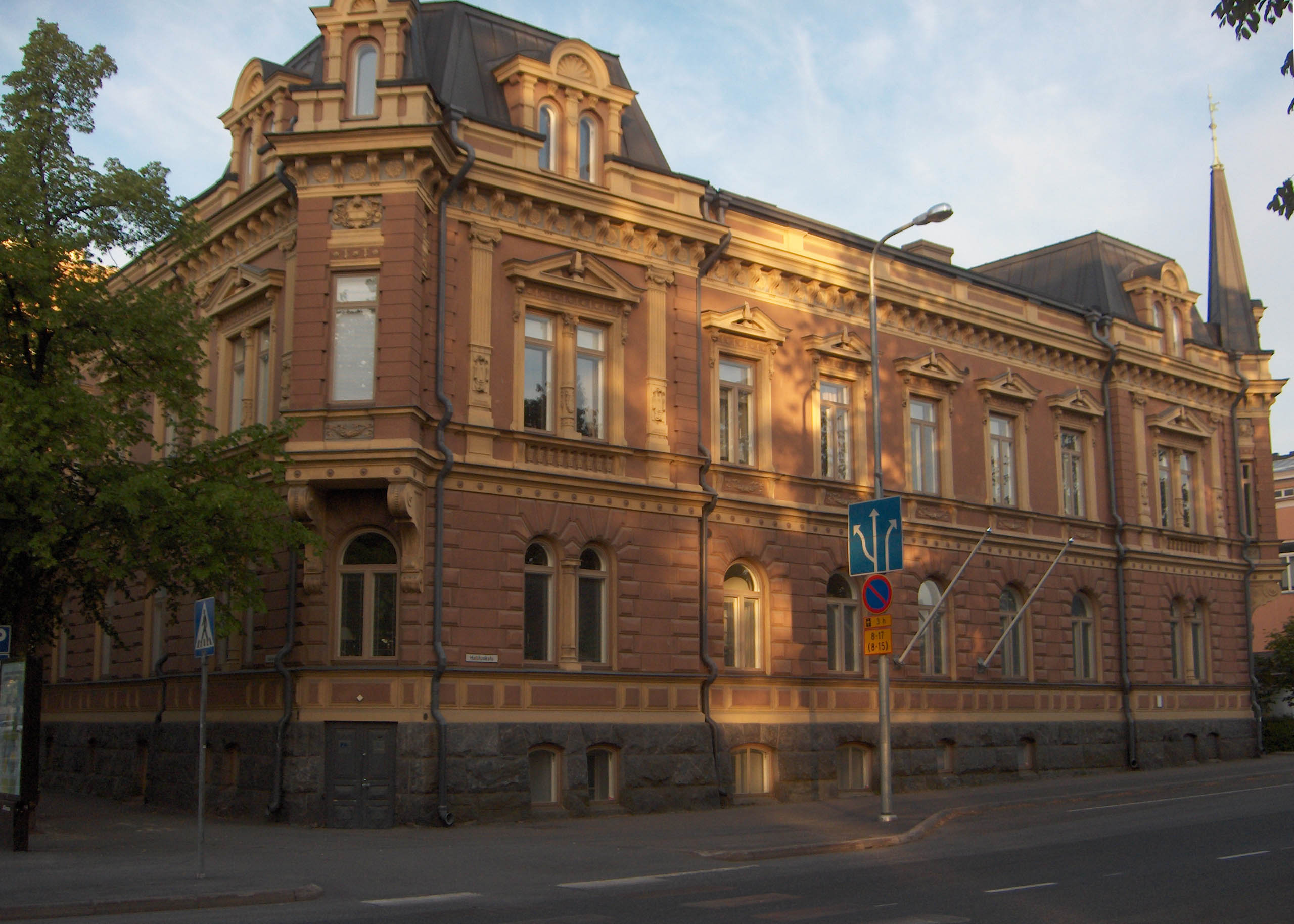
Signelinna (Castle of Signe), Signe Hornborg, 1892

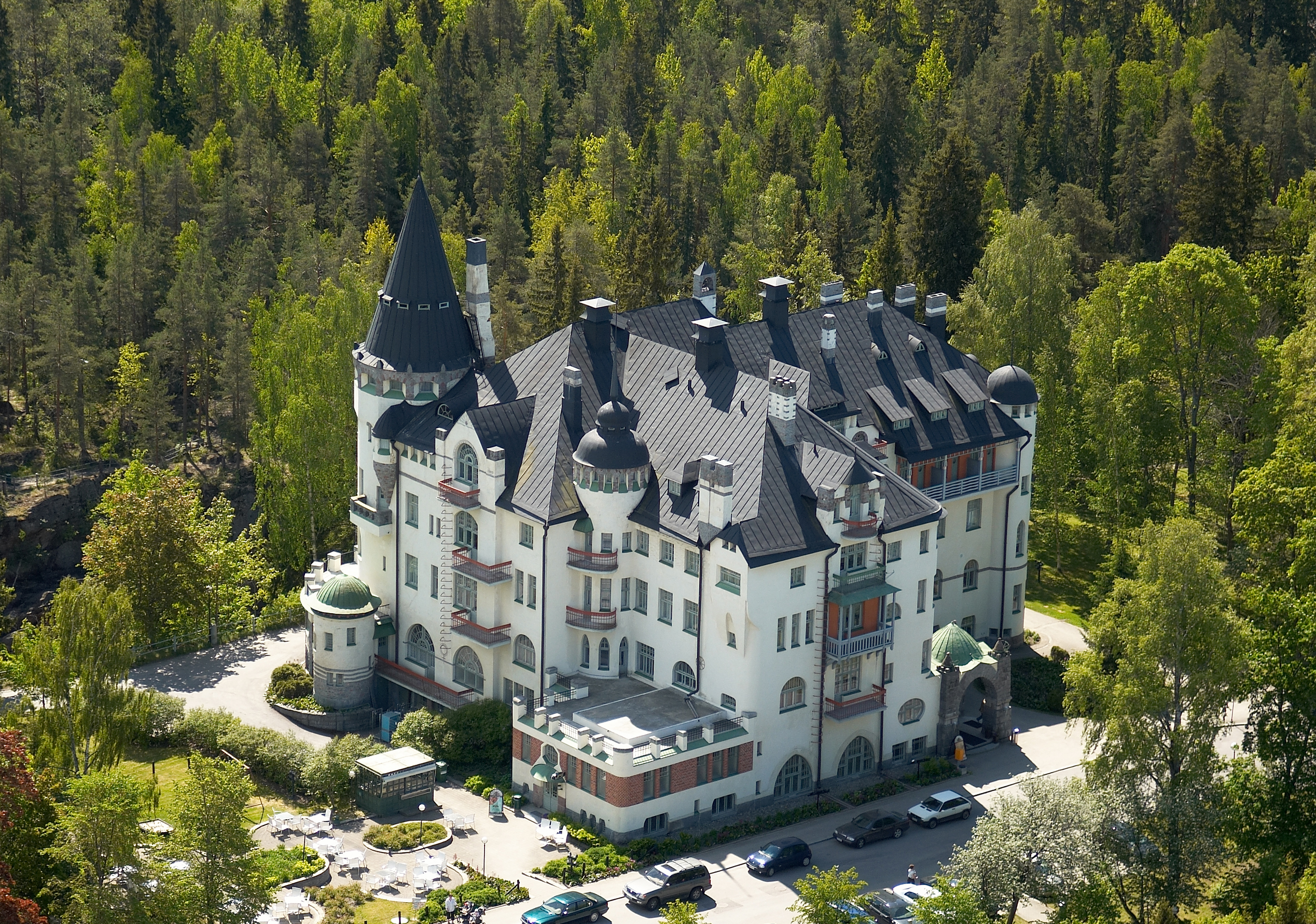
Imatran Valtiohotelli) by Usko Nyström, 1903

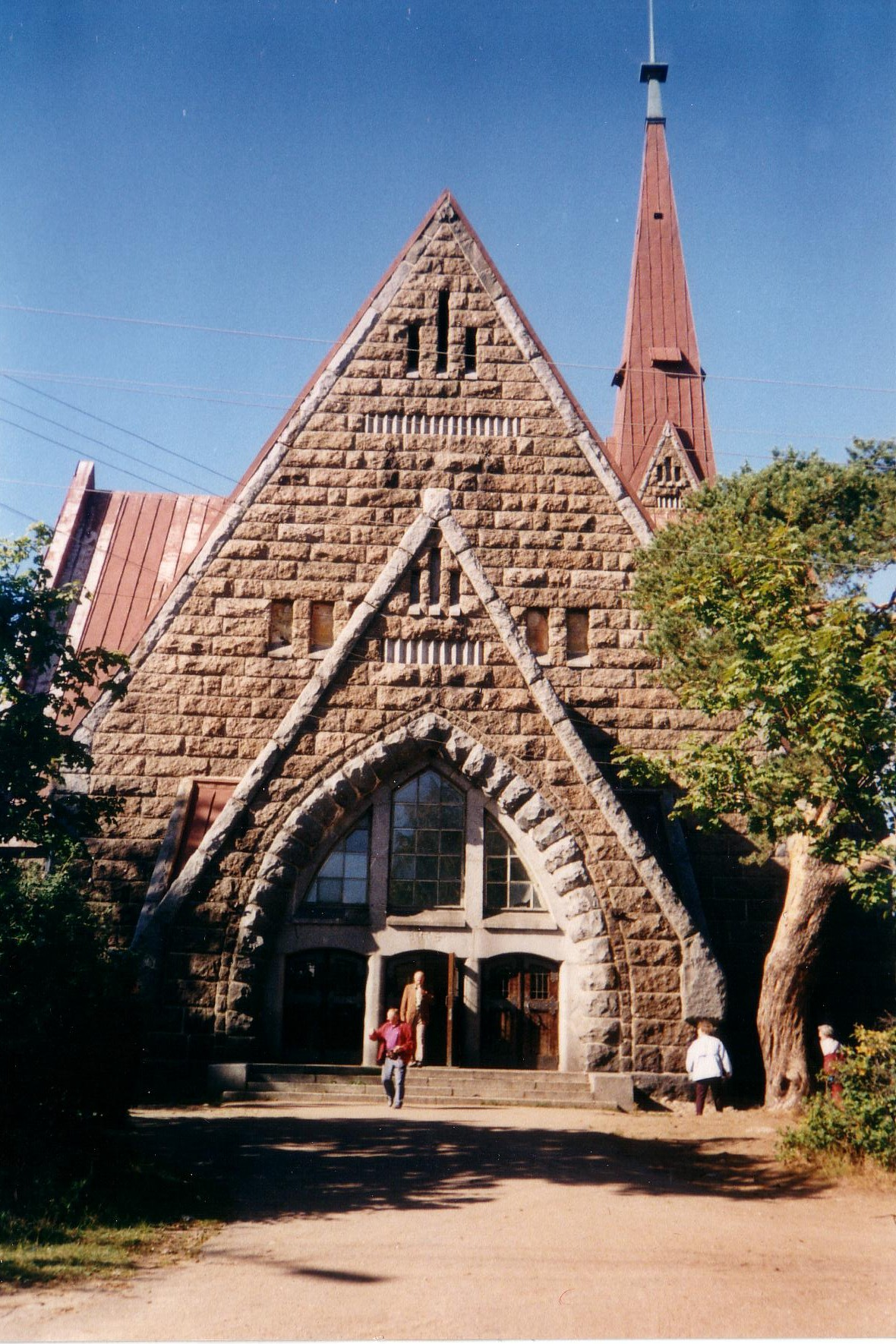
Koivisto Church by Josef Stenbäck, 1904

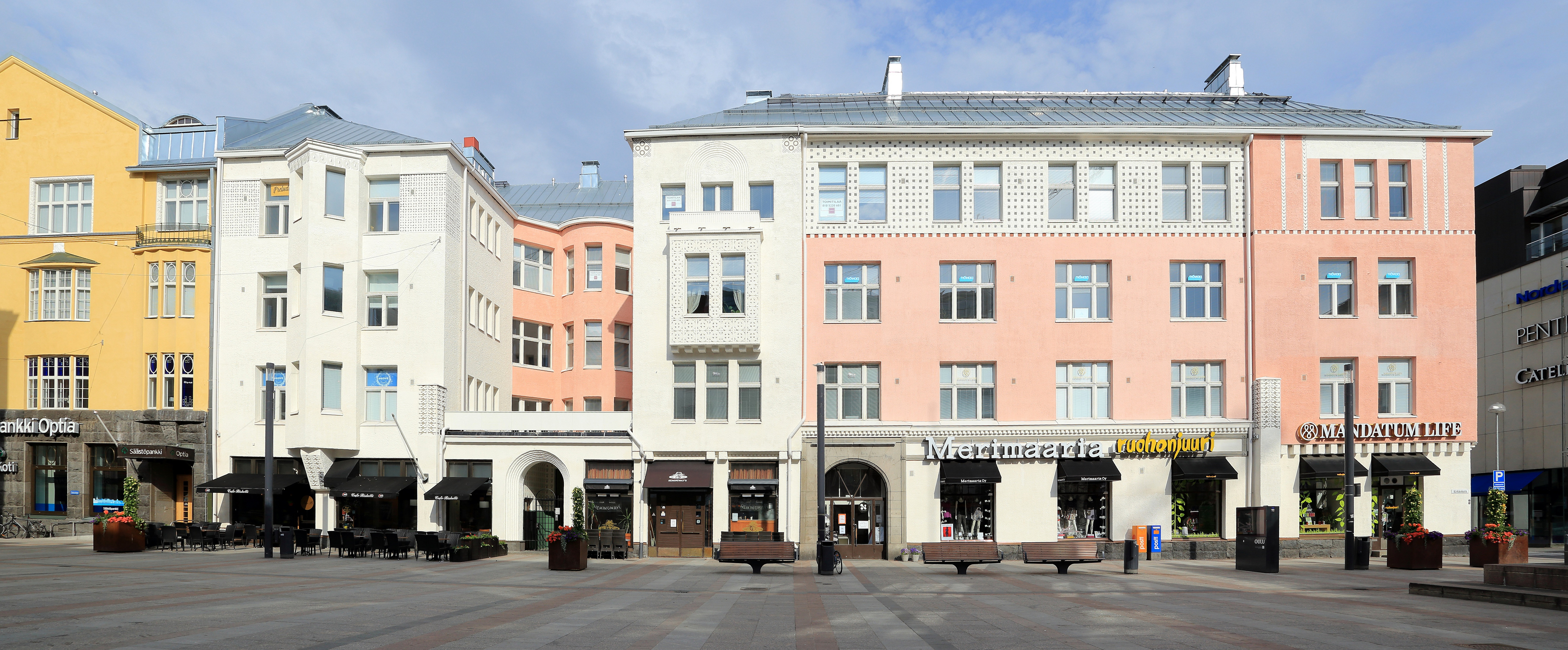
Pallas Building by Valter Thomé, 1907

Notable Golden Age architects
Artist	Notable work
Lars Sonck (1870–1956)	Tampere Cathedral, 1907
Wivi Lönn (1872–1966)	Tampere Central Fire Station, 1908
Eliel Saarinen (1873–1950)	Helsinki Central railway station, 1909
Herman Gesellius (1874–1916)	Wuorio House (Unioninkatu 30), 1909–1914
Armas Lindgren (1874–1929)	Mannerheimintie 7, 1914 (also 5 together with Wivi Lönn)

== See also ==
- Finnish art
