= Maria Wiik =

Finnish painter (1853–1928)

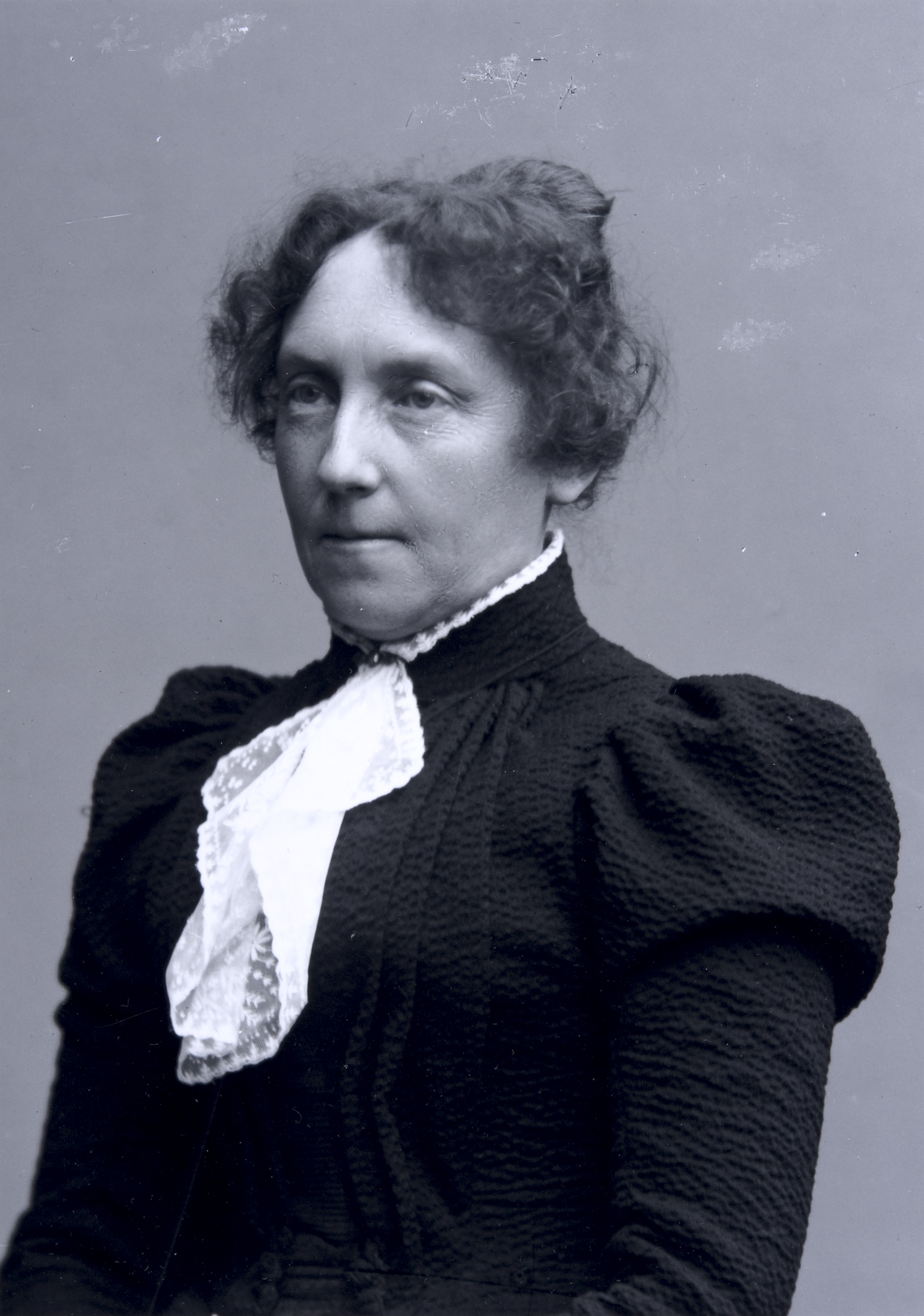
- Born: Maria Catharina Wiik; 3 August 1853; Helsinki, Grand Duchy of Finland
- Died: 2 June 1928 (aged 74); Helsinki, Republic of Finland
- Occupation: Painter
- Known for: Still life, genre images, landscape paintings, portraits

Maria Catharina Wiik (3 August 1853 – 19 June 1928) was a Finnish painter. She worked principally with still life, genre images, landscape paintings and portraits.

== Biography ==
Wiik was born in Helsinki, Finland. She was the daughter of architect Erik Johan Wik (or Wiik) (1804–1876) and his wife Gustava Fredrika Meyer. She was born and grew up in Brunnsparken and attended the Swedish language school Svenska fruntimmersskolan in Helsinki. She then studied drawing with art professor Adolf von Becker.

Encouraged by her family, she studied art during 1874–1875 at the Academy of Fine Arts in Helsinki. In 1875, she continued her art studies in Paris, France, under Tony Robert-Fleury at the Académie Julian, one of the few private schools accepting women at the time.

From 1875 and in 1880 she became a substitute teacher at the Academy of Fine Arts of Helsinki. Her early paintings accepted for the Paris Salon in 1880 were portraits. In 1881, she painted a series of small paintings with a more psychological atmosphere including minute details. In spring 1889, she returned to Paris with her friend, the painter Helene Schjerfbeck to work among others with Puvis de Chavannes. In 1883–1884, they painted in England and then in 1889 at St Ives in Cornwall.

Her painting Out into the World won a bronze medal at the Exposition Universelle (1900) and was included in the 1905 book Women Painters of the World by Walter Shaw Sparrow.

Her last trip to Paris took place in 1905. The rest of her life she spent in Helsinki. Her vision deteriorated, and in 1925 she underwent an eye surgery. Wiik died in Helsinki in 1928.

== Works ==
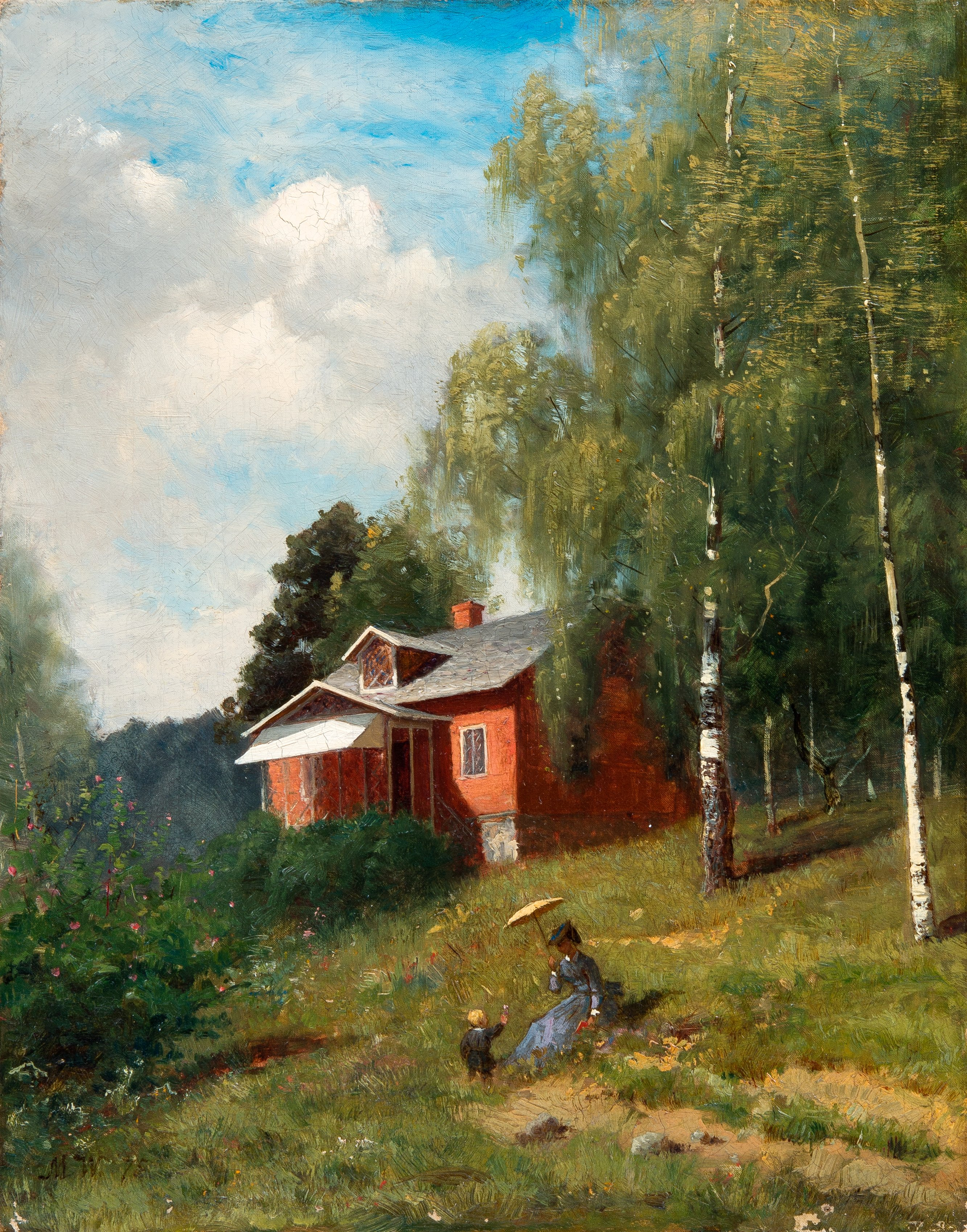
Summer Idyll, 1875

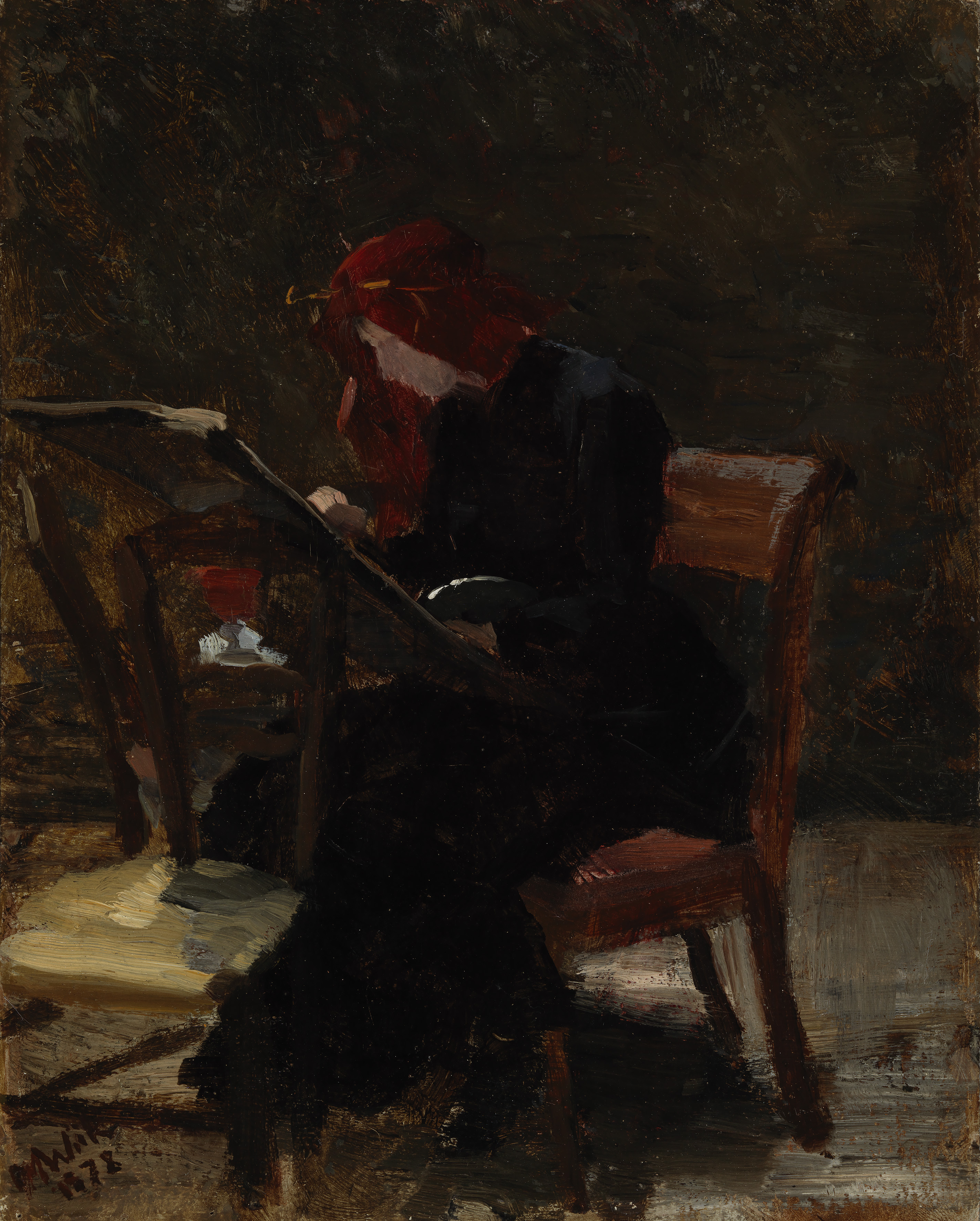
La Polonaise, 1878

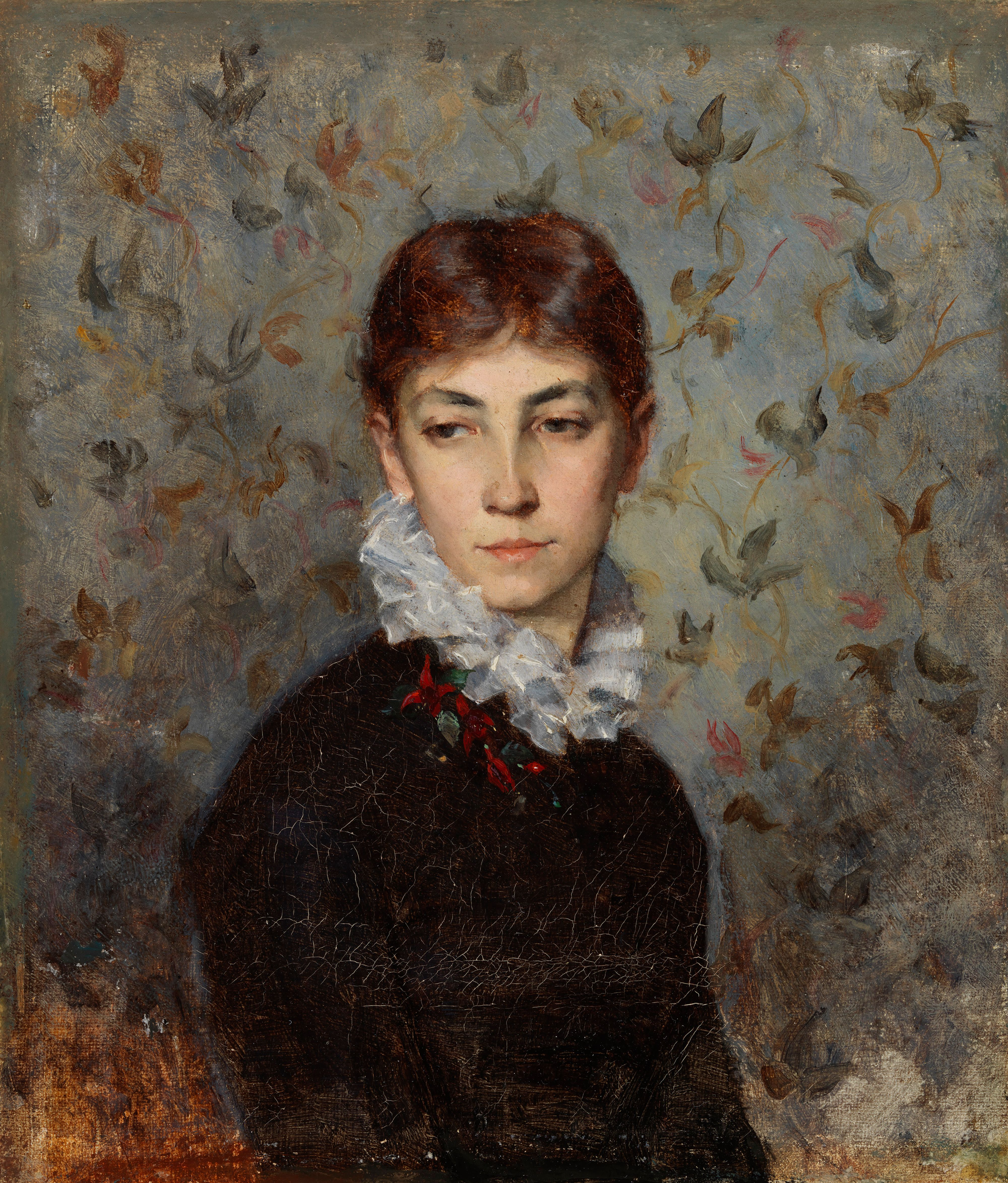
Portrait of Hilda Wiik, 1880

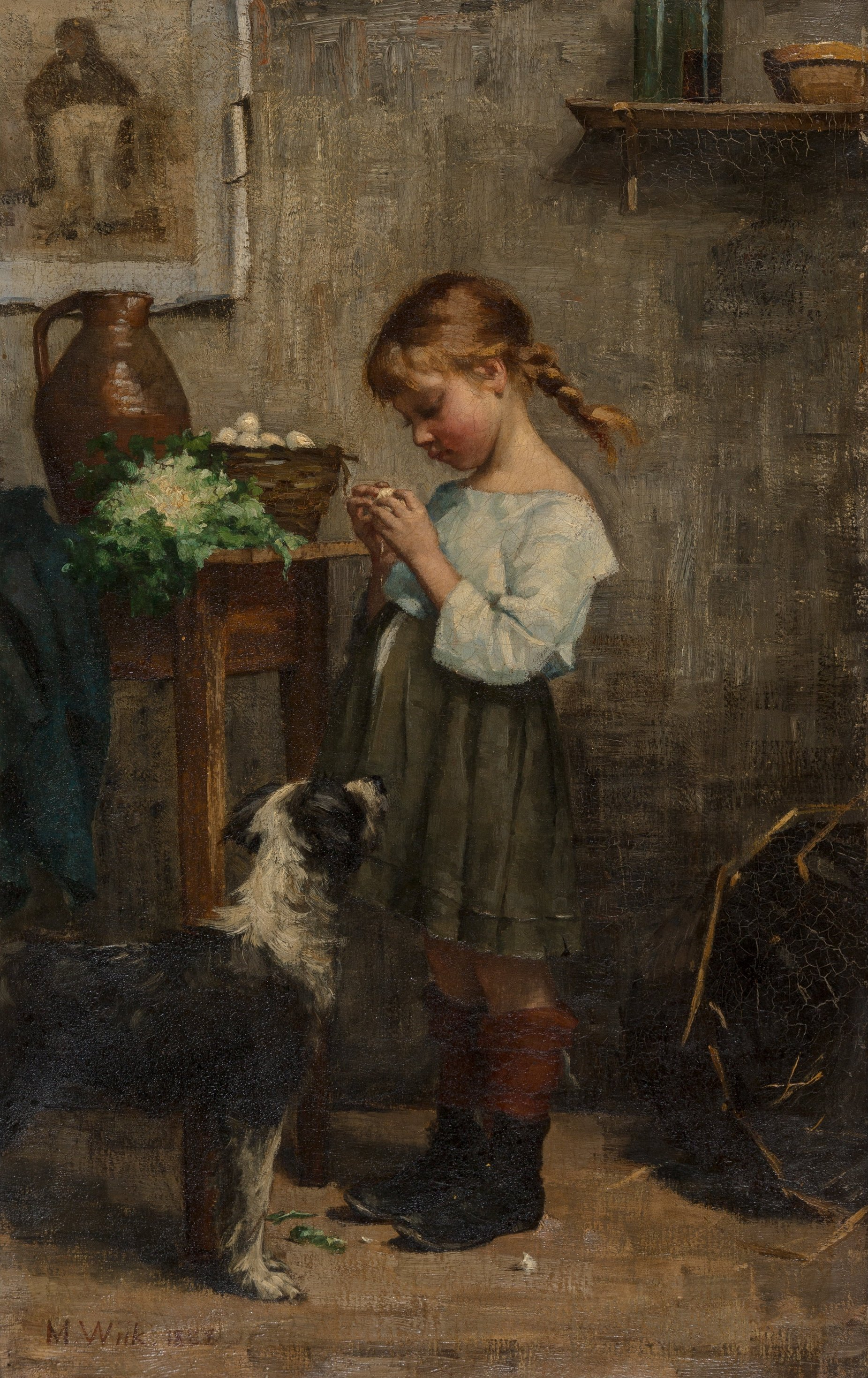
An Unlikely Duo, 1882

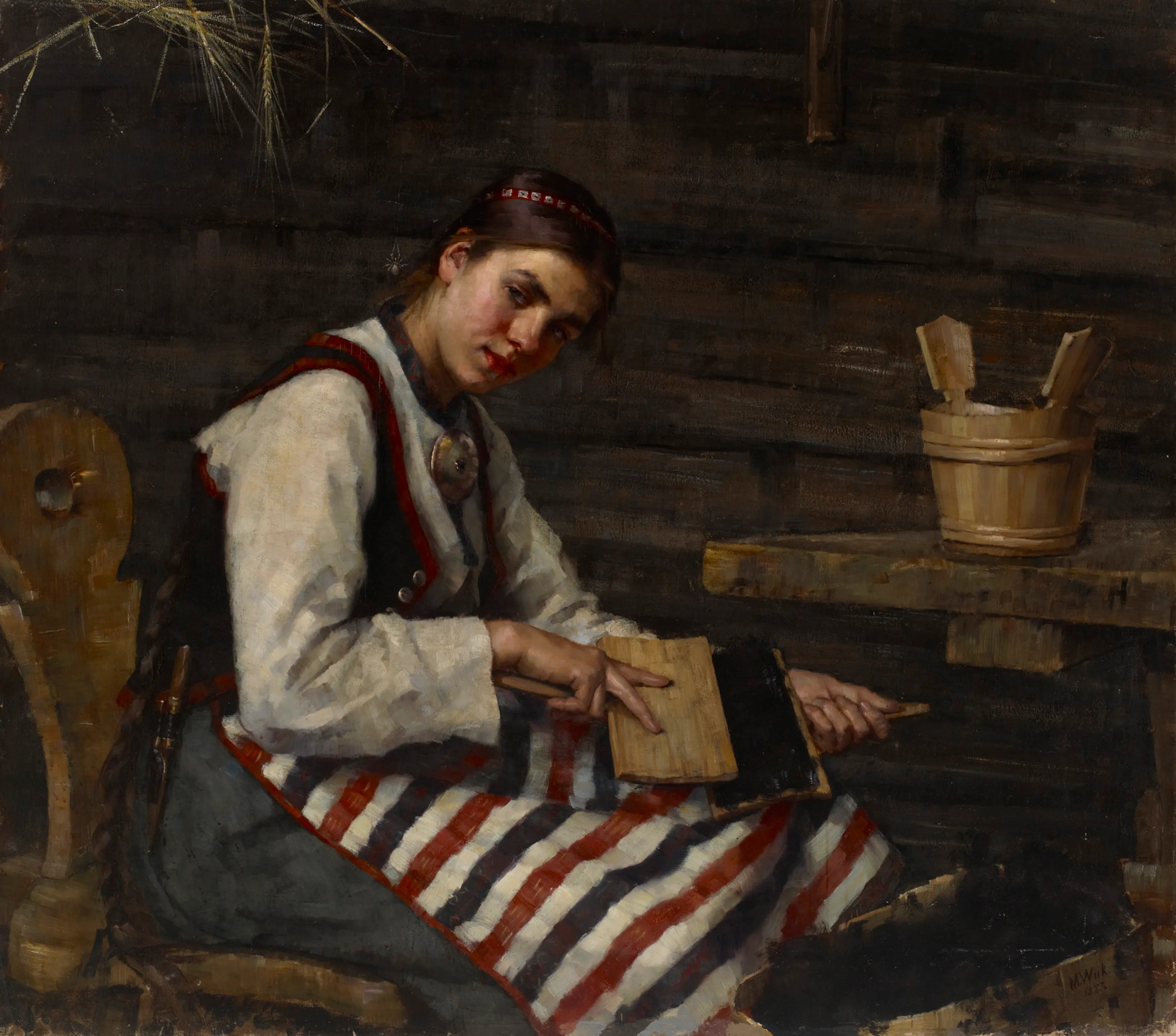
Girl Carding, 1883

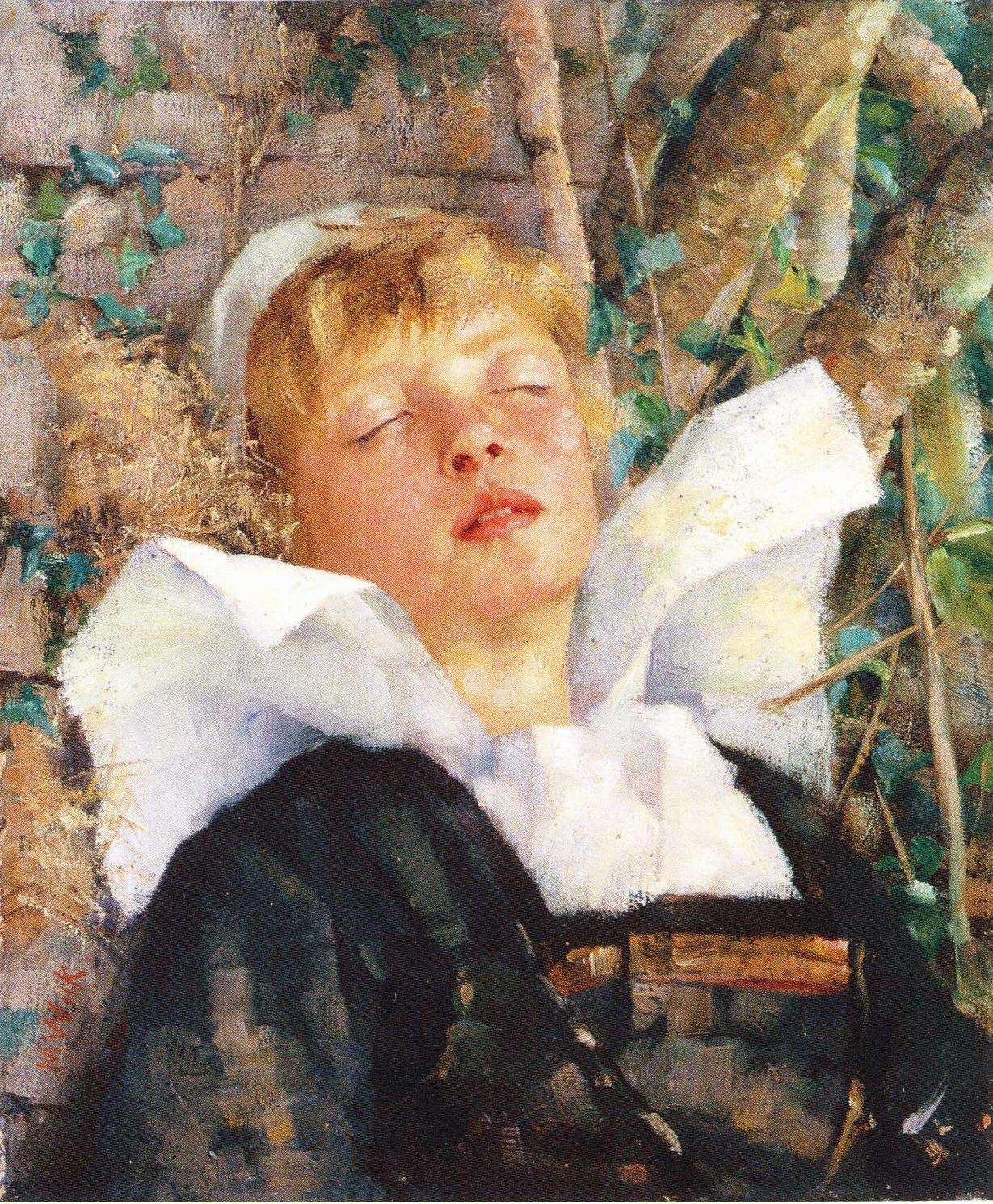
In the Summer Heat, 1883

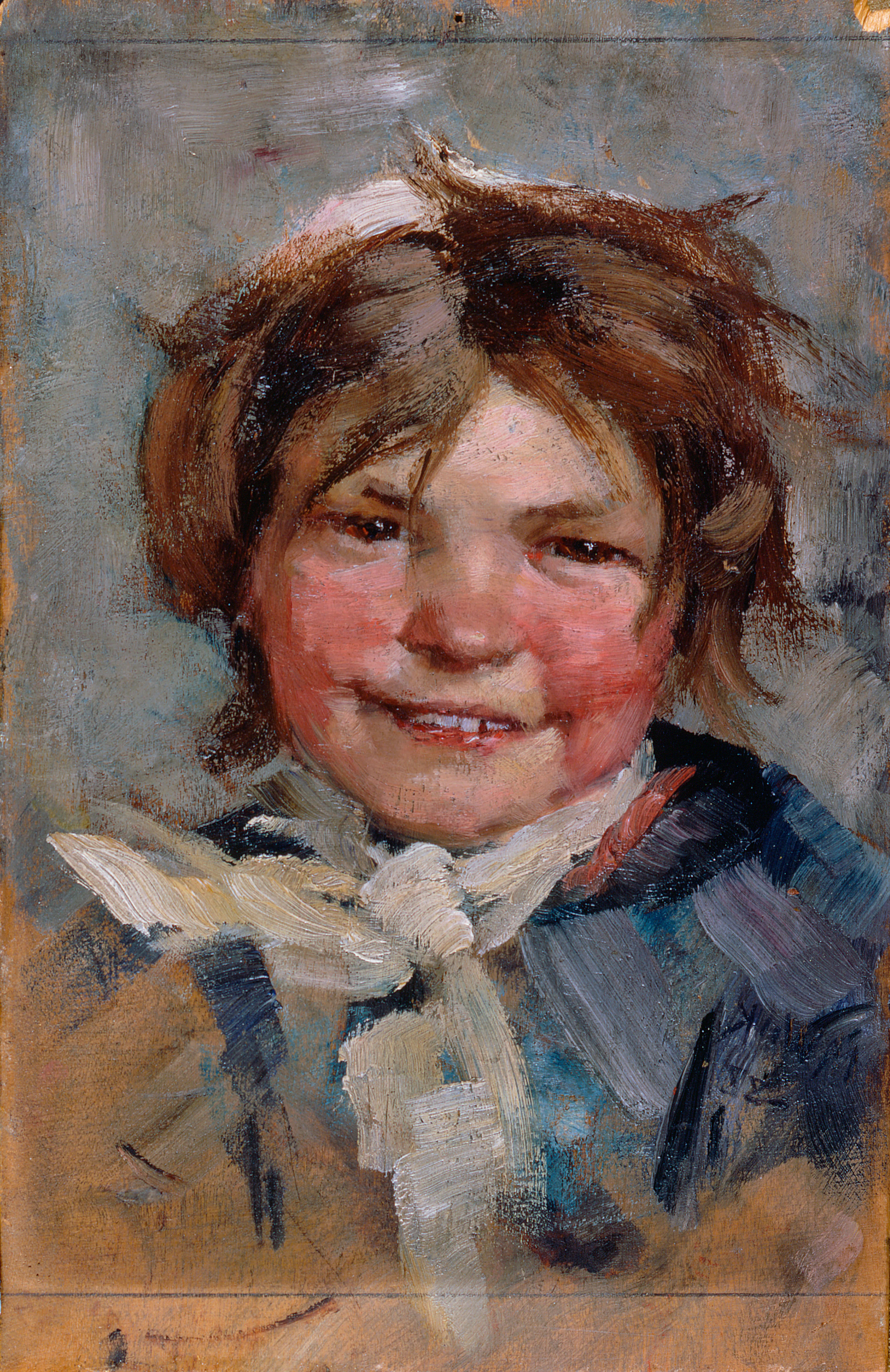
Laughing Girl, 1883

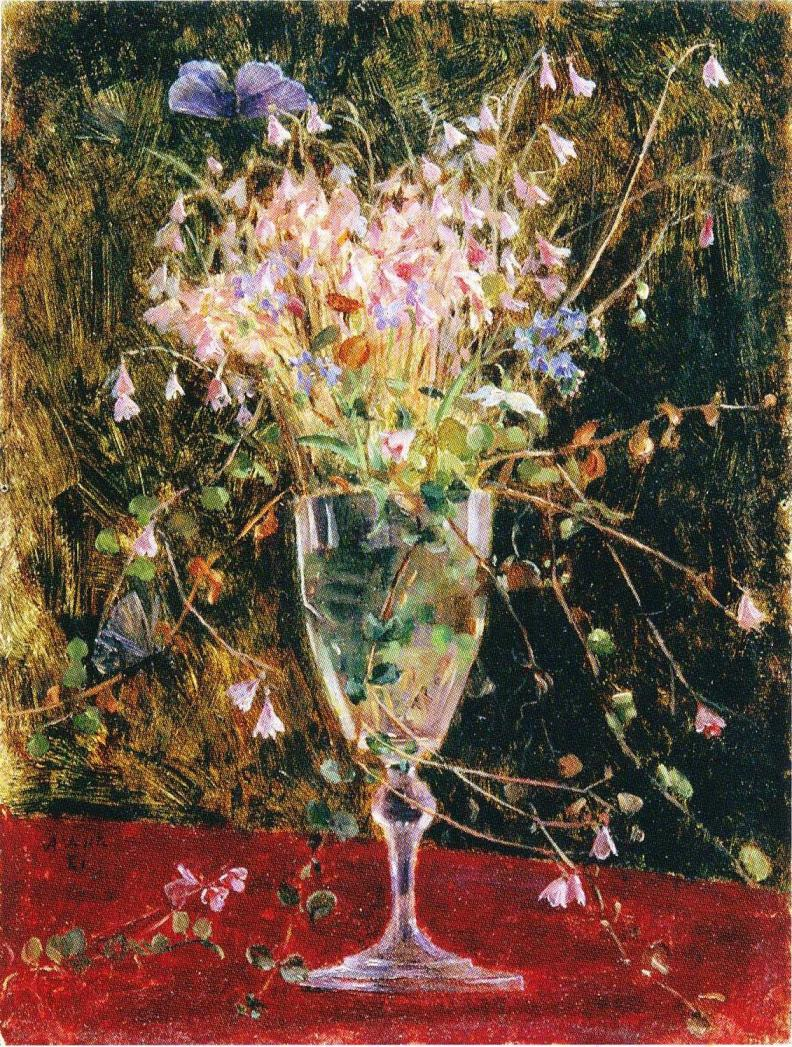
Linnaea Borealis, c. 1883

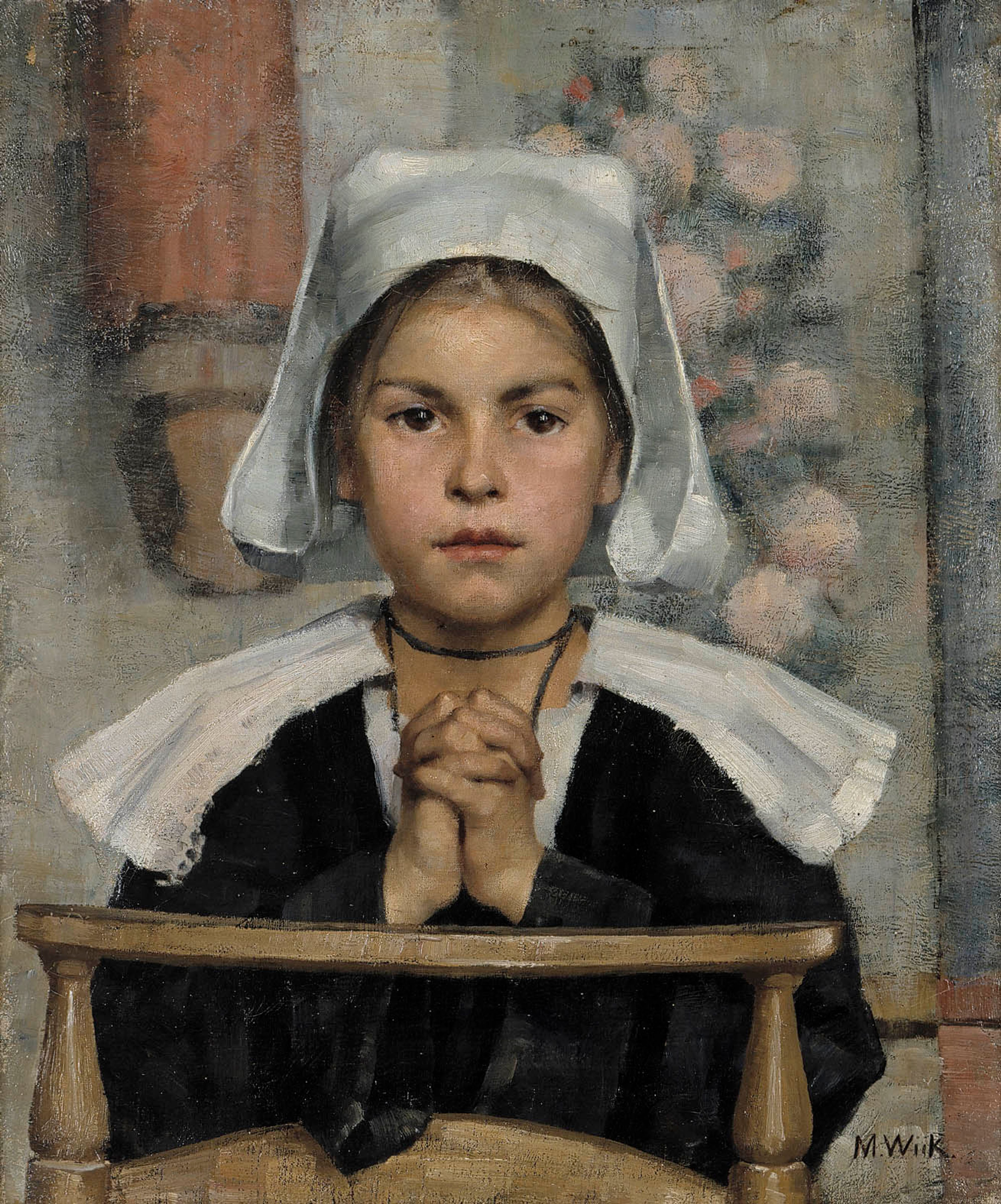
In the Church, 1884

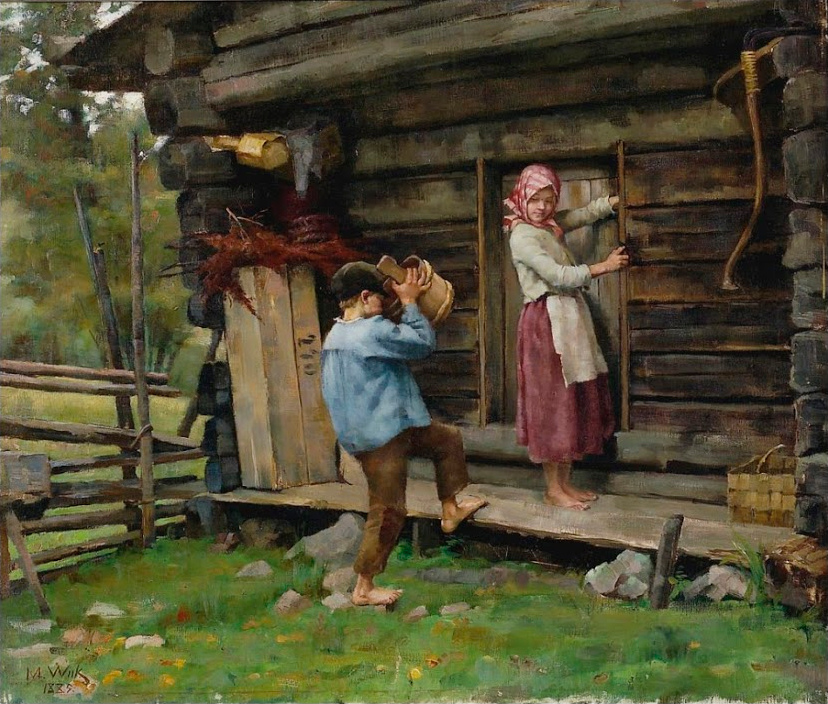
From Häme, 1885

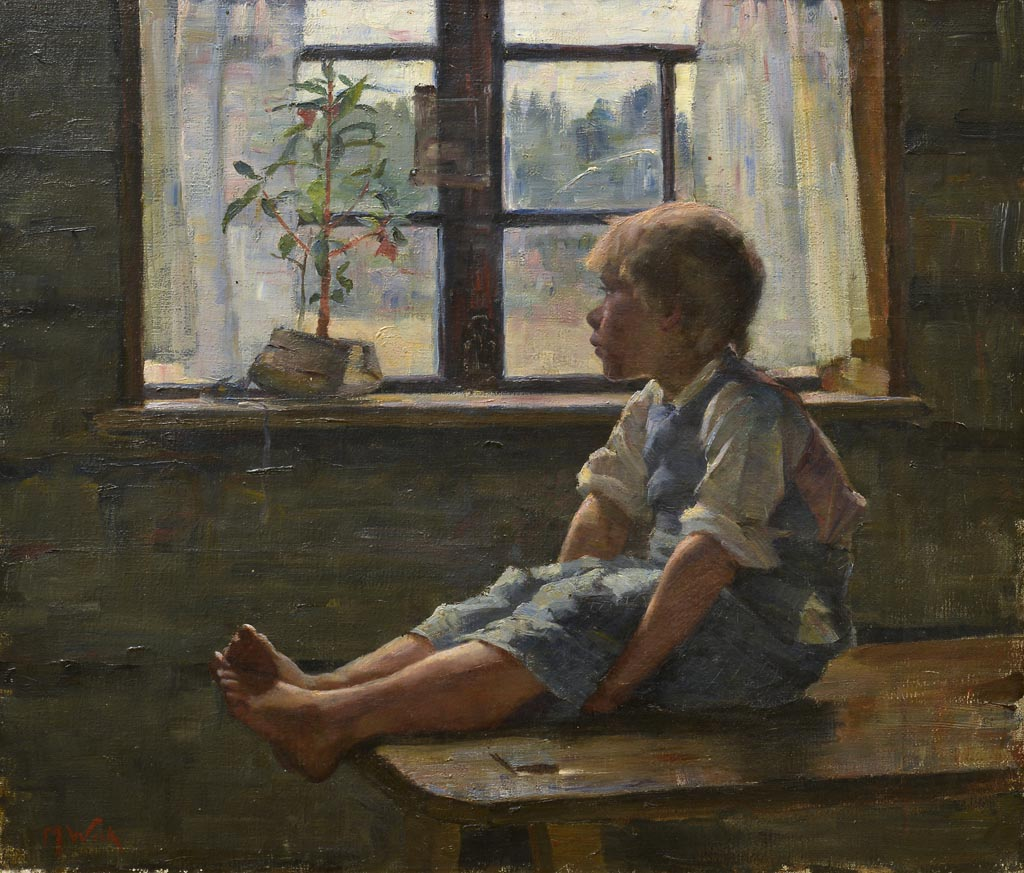
Alone at Home, 1885

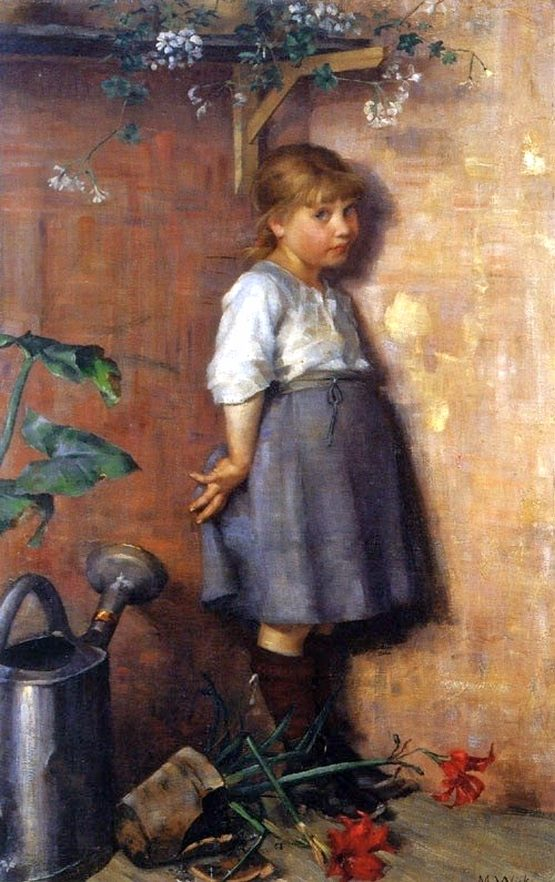
Bad Conscience, 1886

Woman with a Parasol, 1886

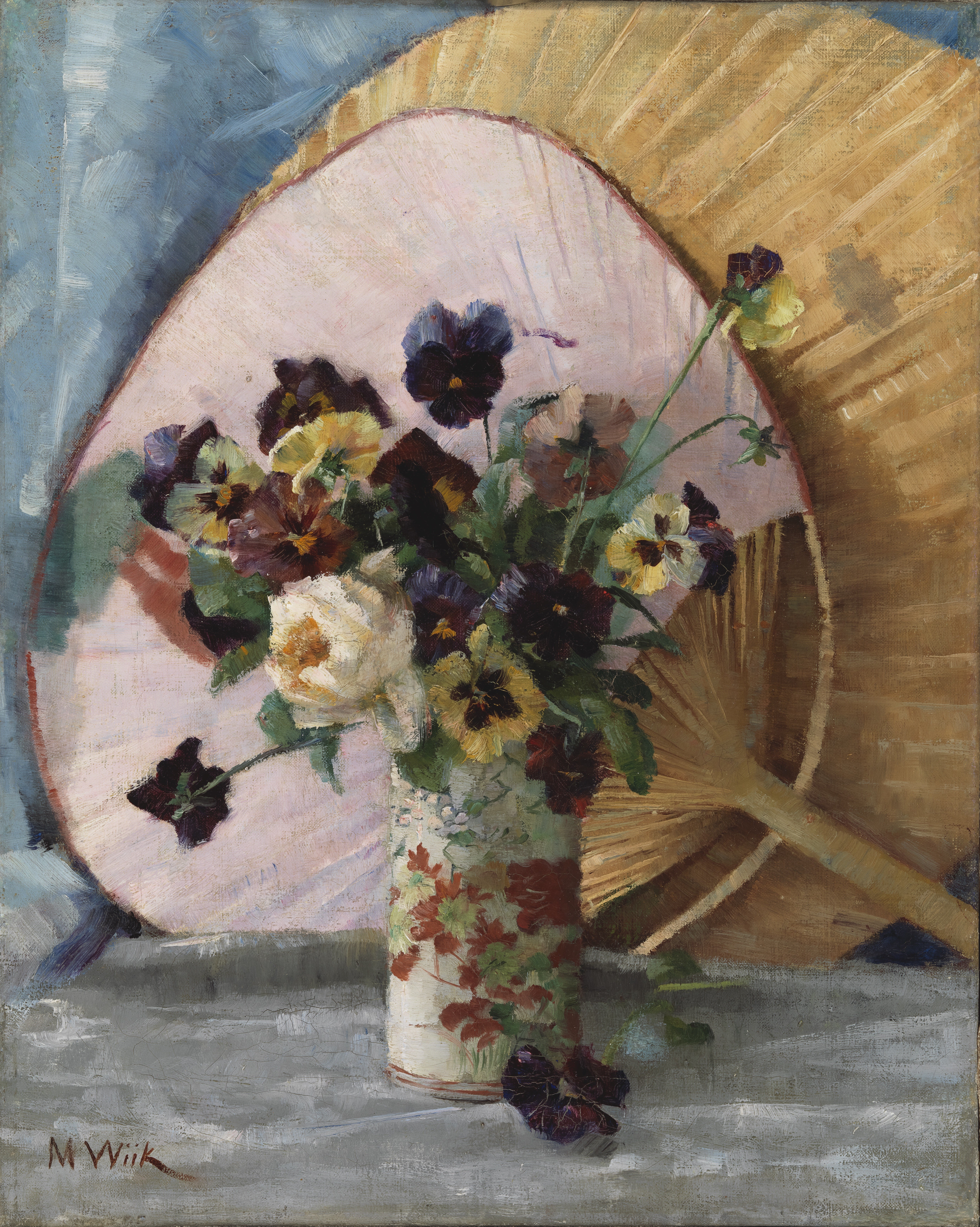
A Study of Pansies and a Japanese Fan, c. 1887

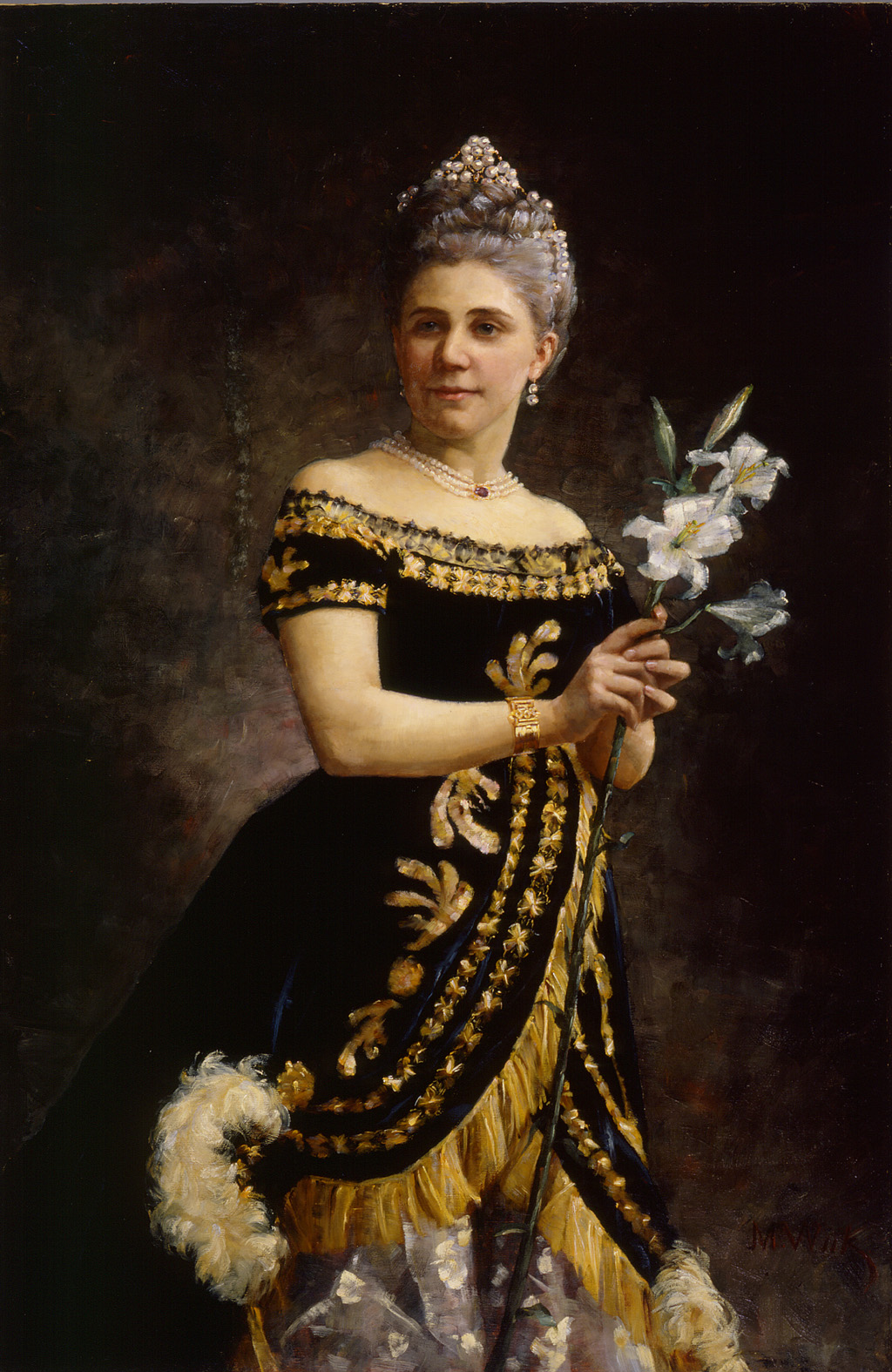
Ida Basilier-Magelssen's portrait, 1887

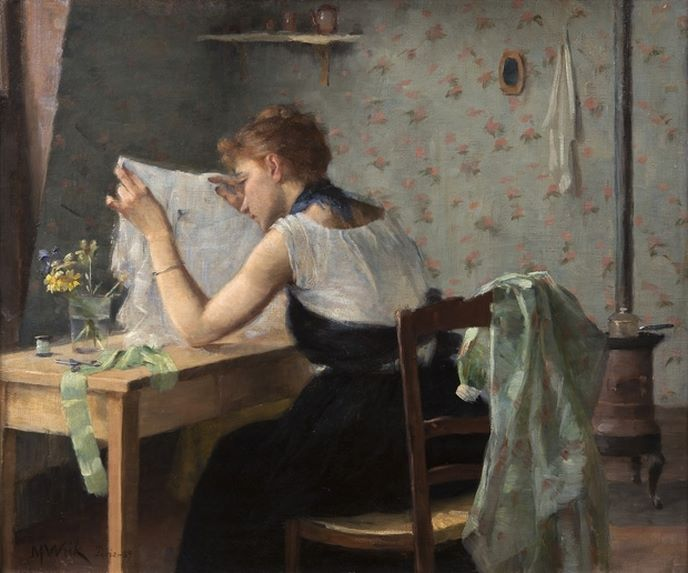
At the Attic Chamber, 1889, the artist's sister Hilda Wiik at their apartment in Paris

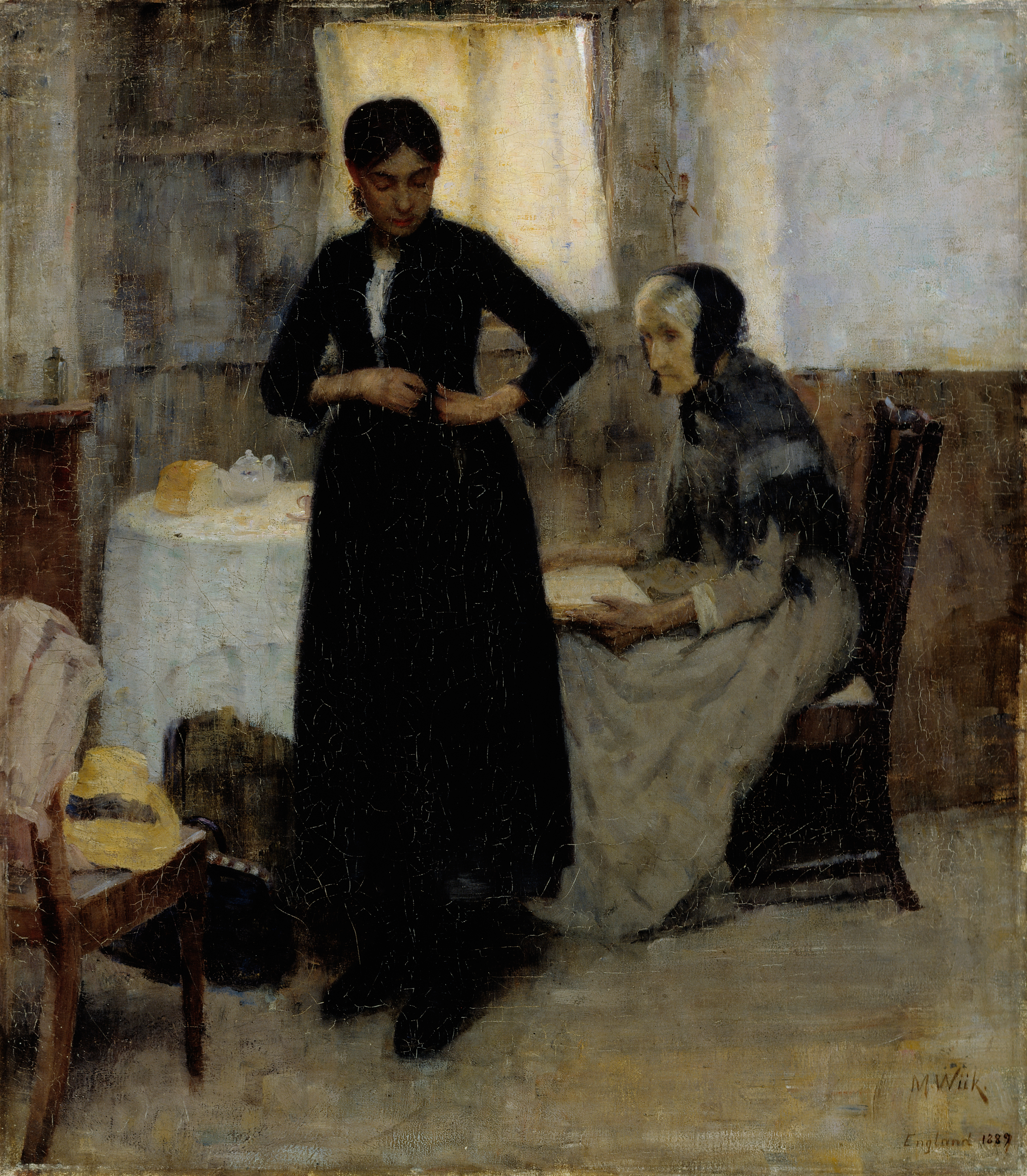
Out into the World, 1889

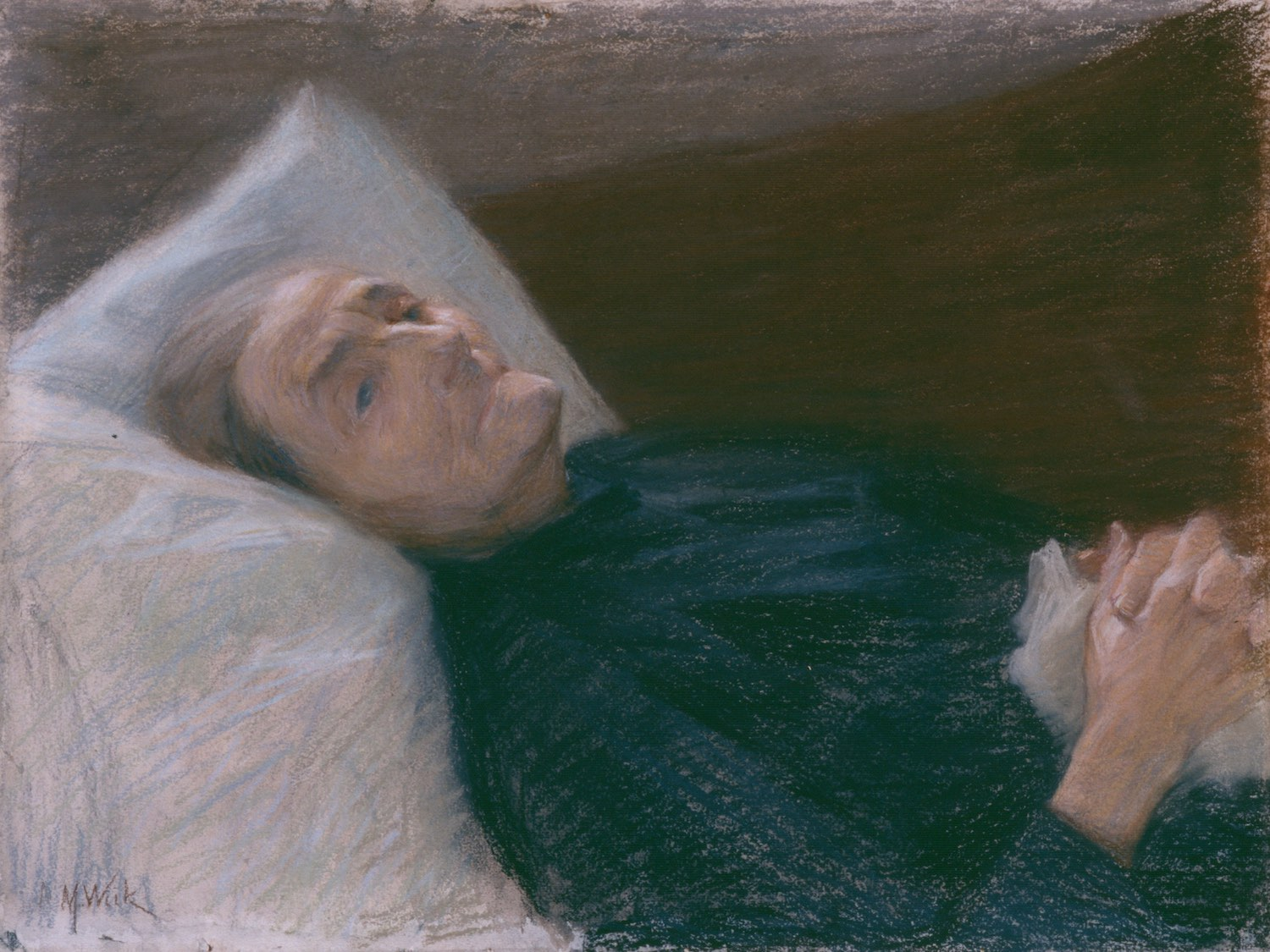
Old Woman in Her Sickbed, 1895–96

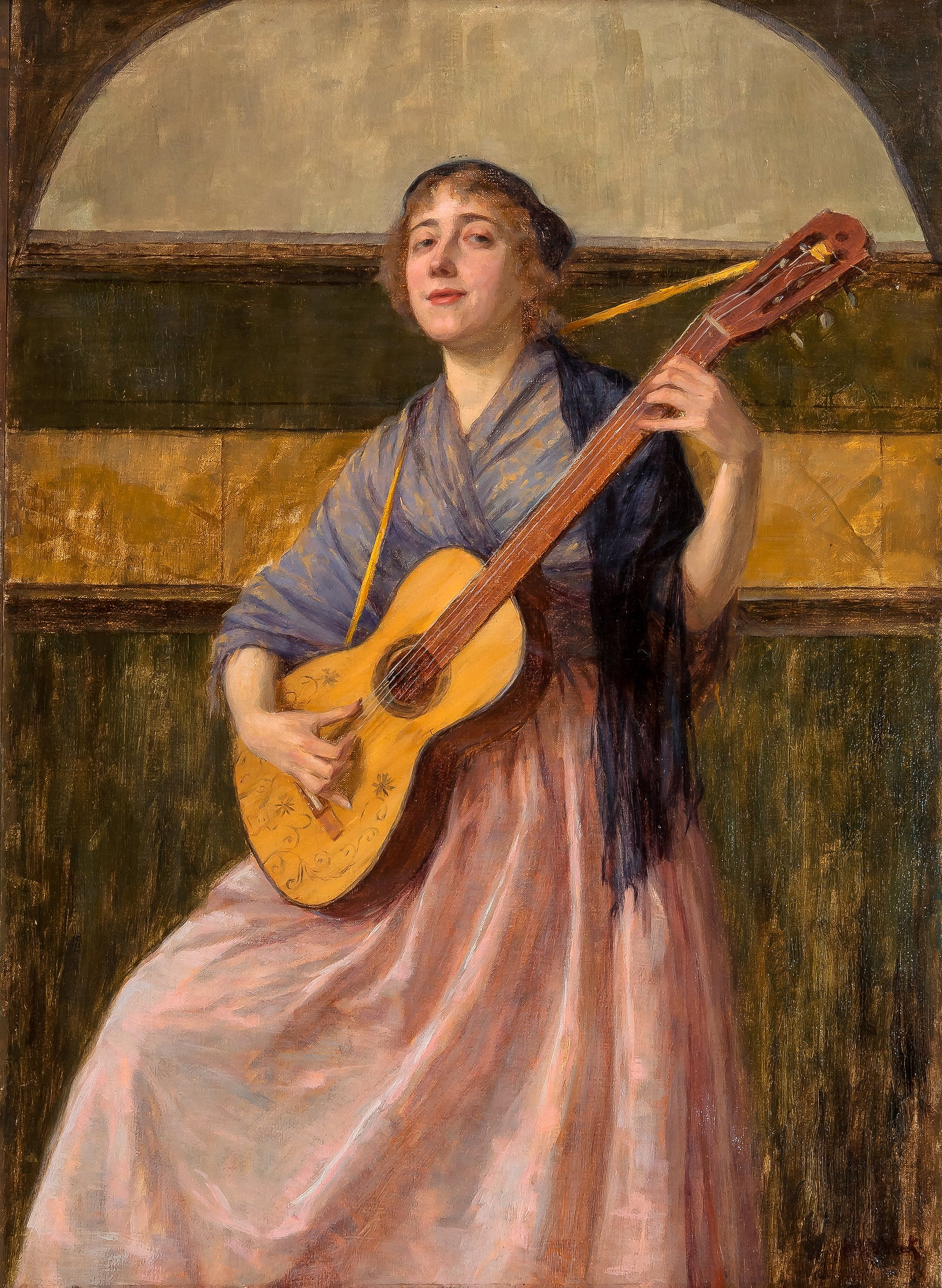
Ballad, 1898

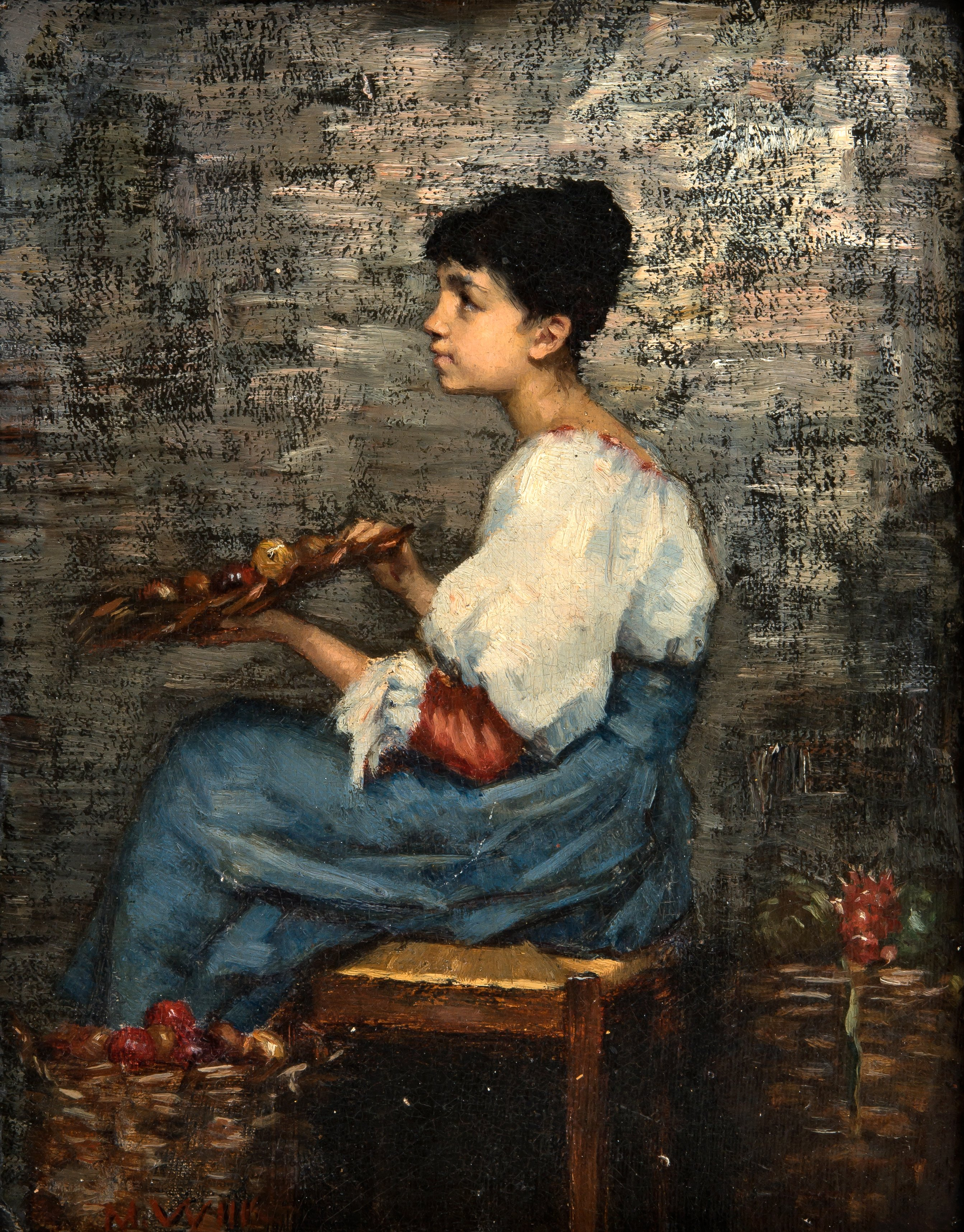
Fruit Seller, unknown date

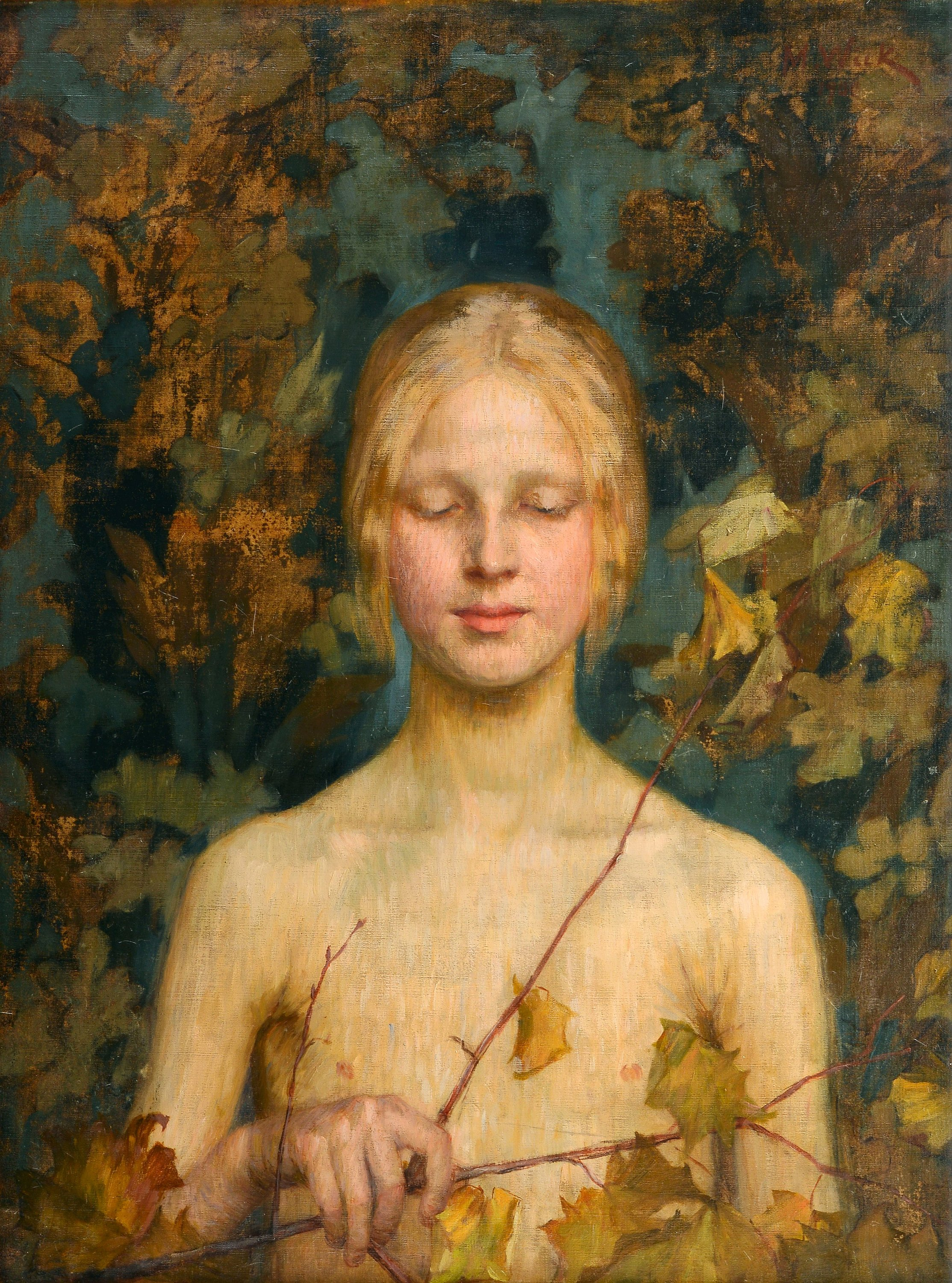
Innocentia, 1900

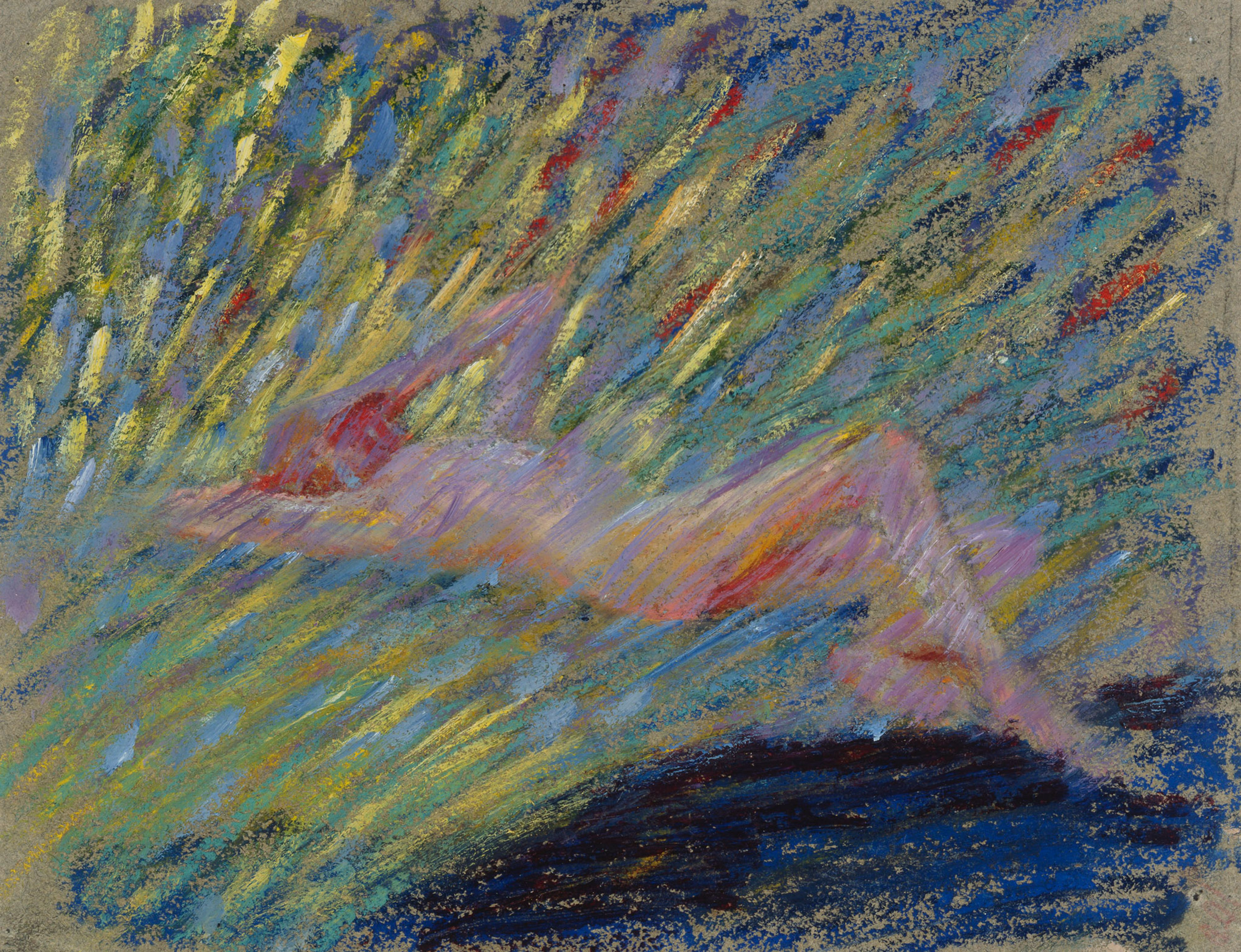
Naked Lying Female Model, 1904

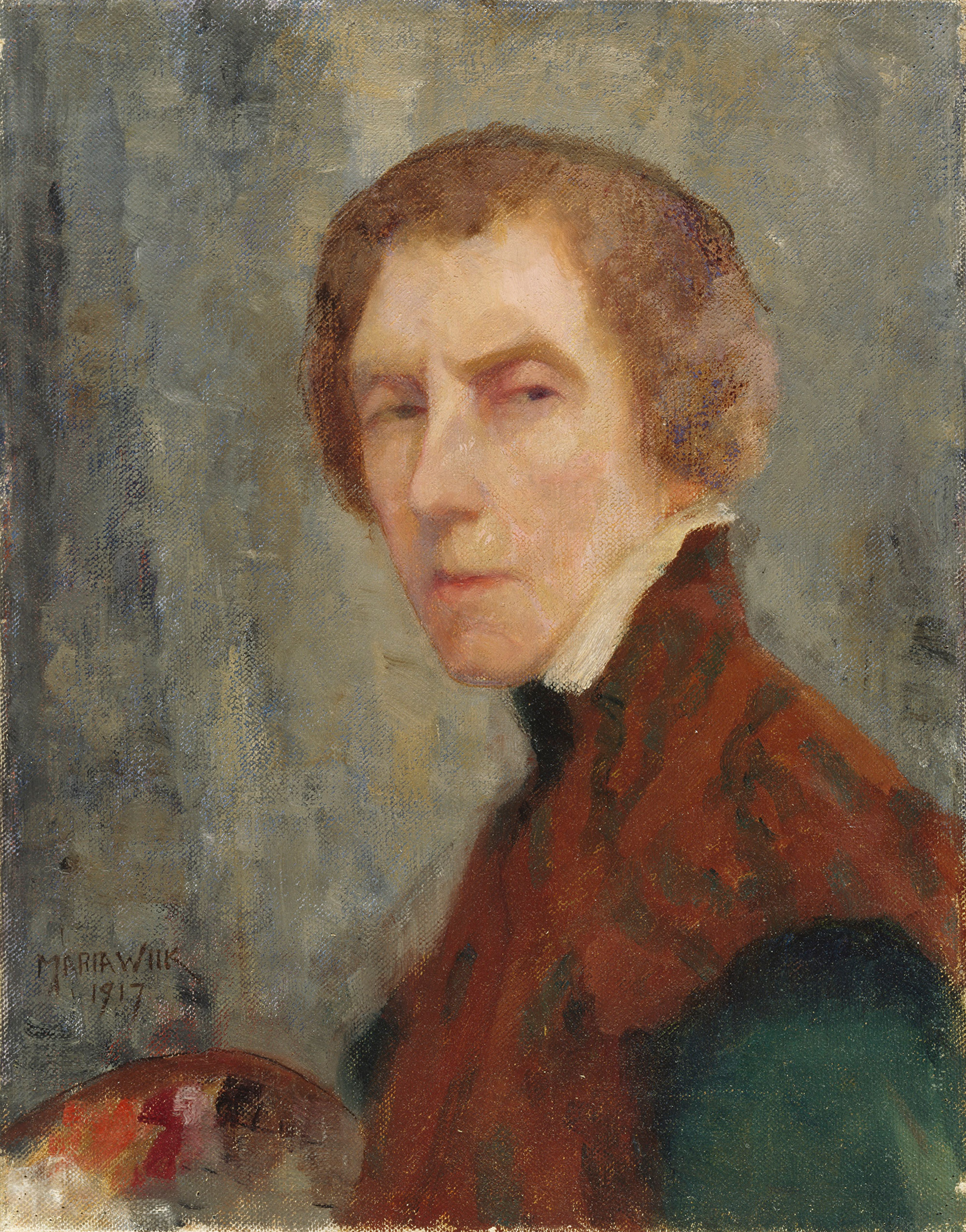
Self-Portrait, 1917

== See also ==
- Golden Age of Finnish Art
- Finnish art
