= Out into the World =

Painting by Maria Wiik

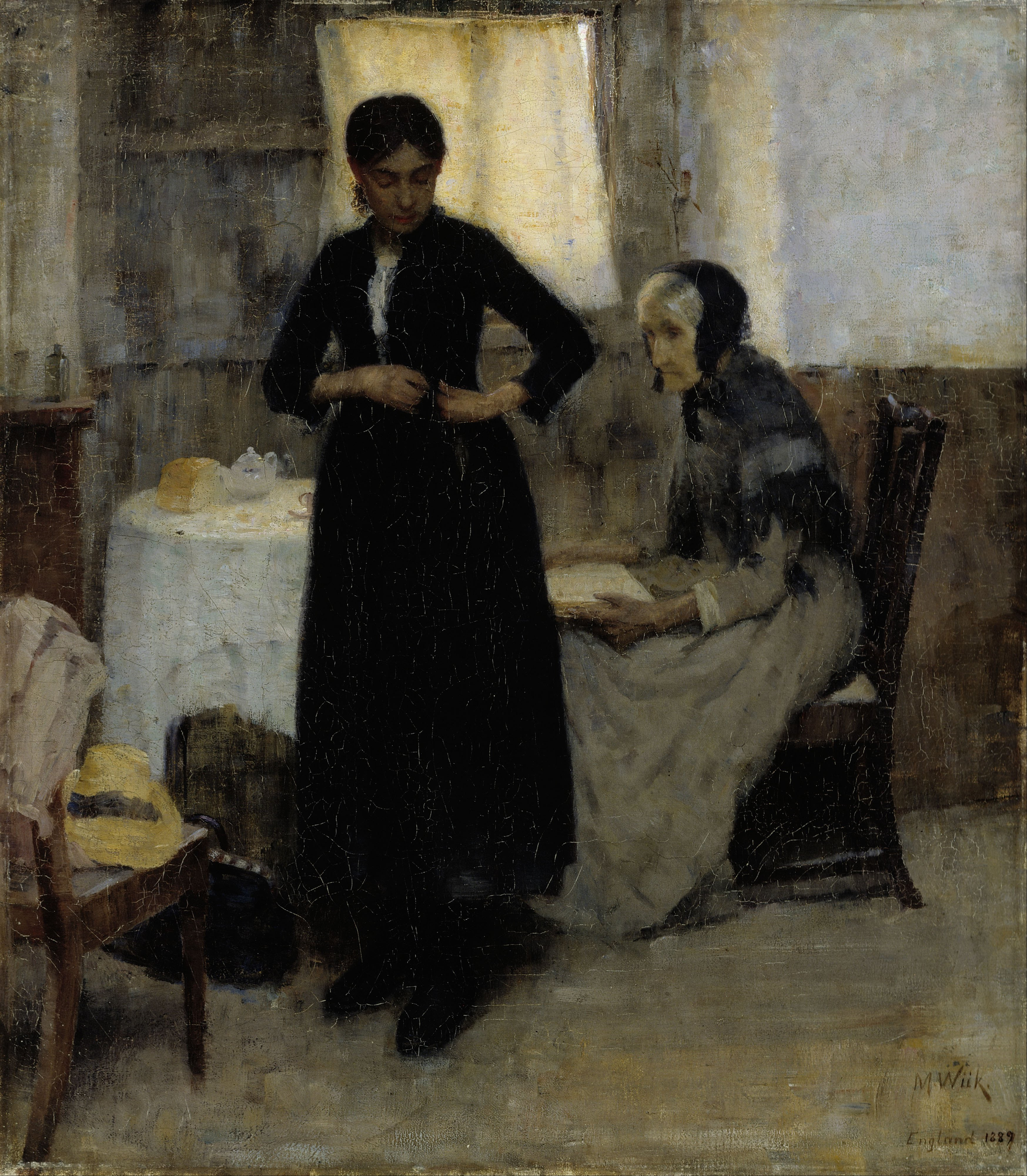
- Artist: Maria Wiik
- Year: 1889
- Medium: Oil on canvas
- Dimensions: 69 cm × 61 cm (27 in × 24 in)
- Location: Ateneum, Helsinki

Out into the World is an 1889 oil on canvas painting by the Finnish artist Maria Wiik in the Ateneum.

This painting shows two women in an interior, with one seated at a table looking up from her book as her companion adjusts her dress before leaving. The muted tones are accentuated by a drawn curtain.

This painting, which won a bronze medal at the Exposition Universelle in Paris in 1900, is considered her masterpiece. This painting was included in the 1905 book Women Painters of the World.
