= Helena Westermarck =

Finnish artist and writer (1857–1938)

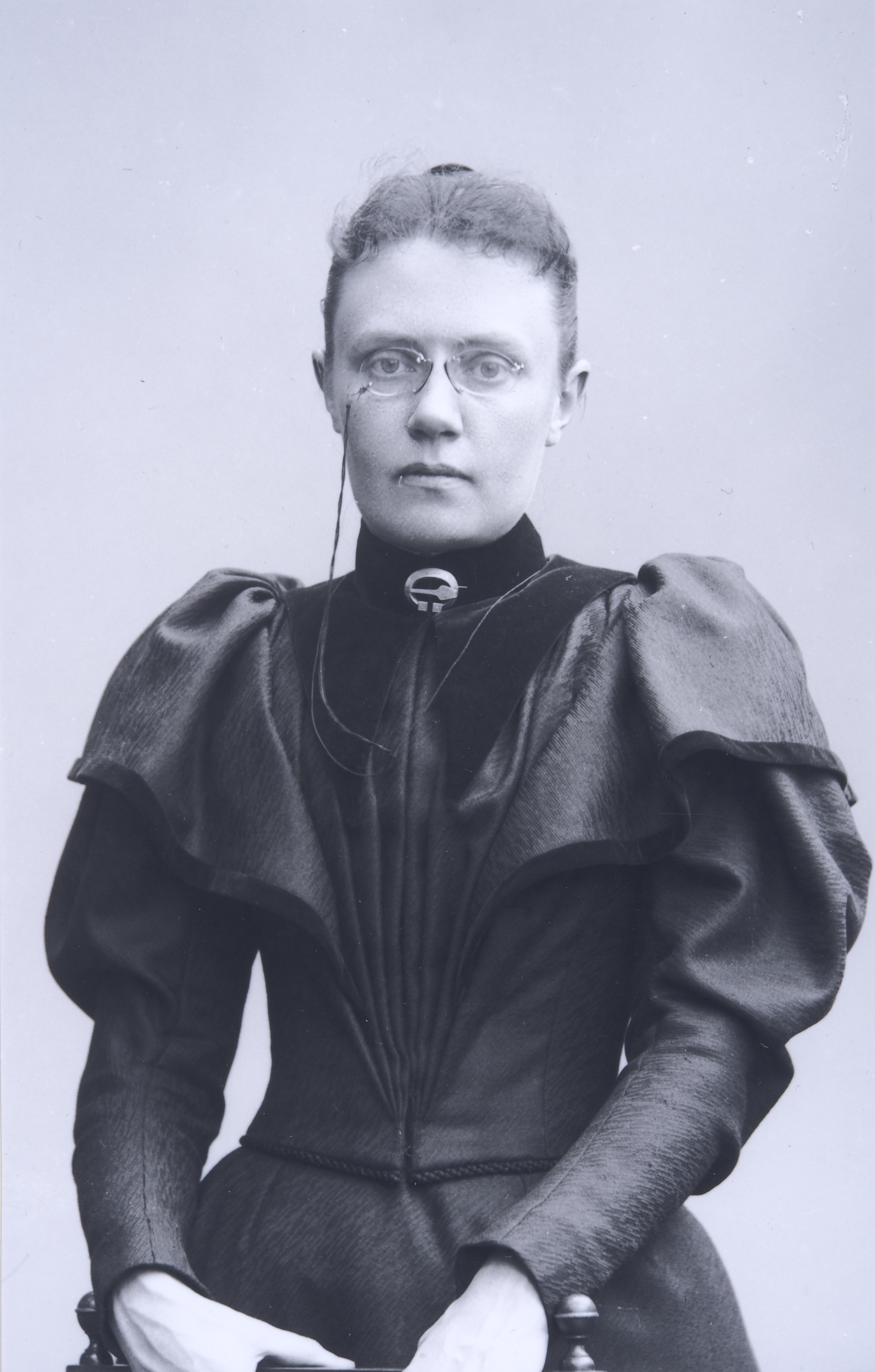
- Westermarck in 1894
- Born: Helena Charlotta Westermarck; 20 November 1857; Helsinki, Grand Duchy of Finland
- Died: 5 April 1938 (aged 80); Helsinki, Finland
- Known for: Painter, writer

Helena Charlotta Westermarck (20 November 1857, Helsinki – 5 April 1938, Helsinki) was a Swedish-speaking Finnish artist and writer. She is known for her pioneering biographies of women.

== Biography ==
Westermarck studied art at the Drawing School of the Finnish Art Society and the private academy of Adolf von Becker. During her studies, she met Helene Schjerfbeck, who remained a close friend for the rest of their lives. Westermarck and Schjerfbeck were a part of a group of female artists known as "the painter sisters." This group included Maria Wiik and Elin Danielson-Gambogi.

Westermarck worked for long periods in France, often in the company of Schjerfbeck, and developed a sensible realistic style, especially with portraits and figure compositions. At the Exposition Universelle (1889), she received honorable mention for her painting Strykerskor.

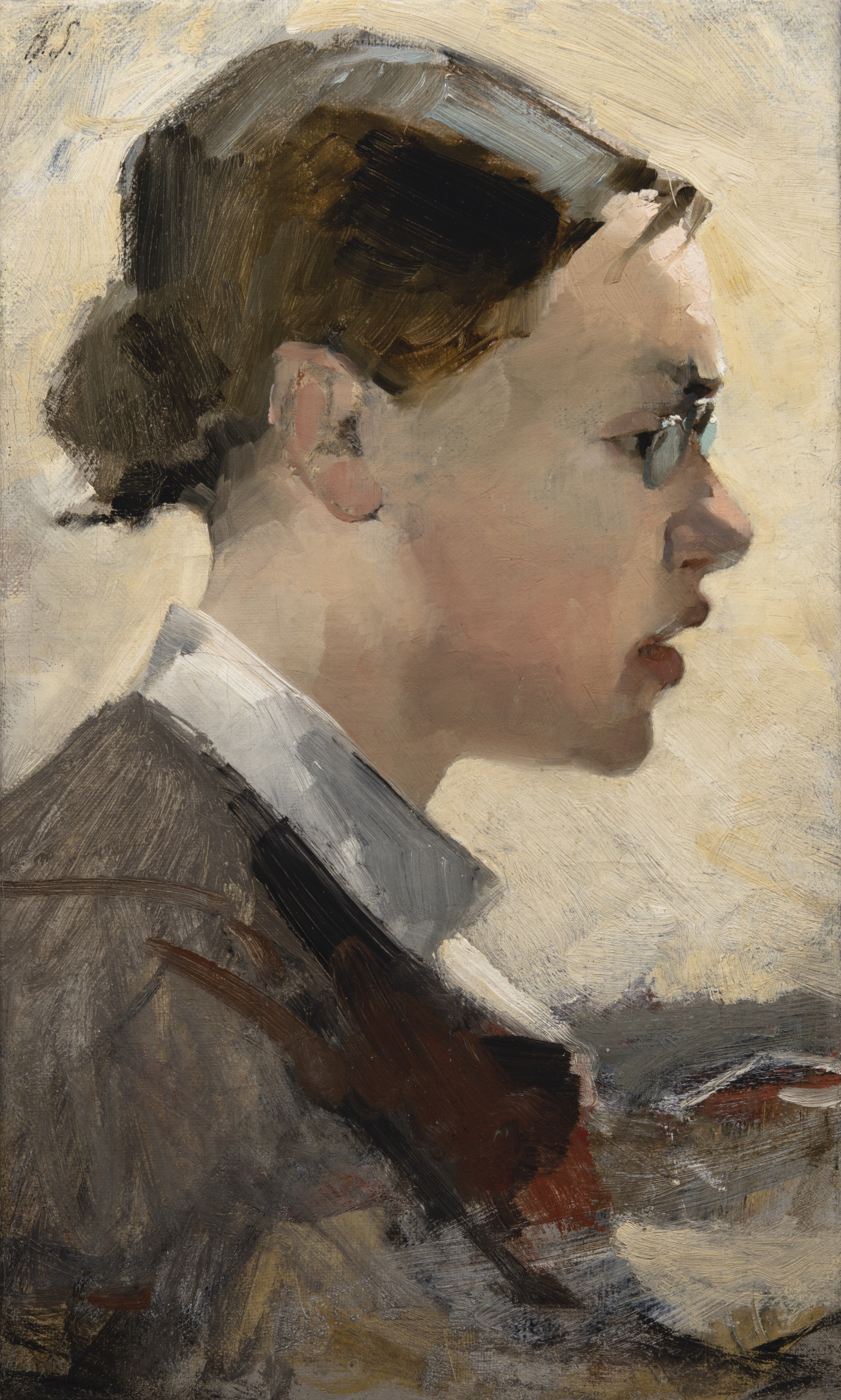
Portrait by Helene Schjerfbeck, 1884

After contracting tuberculosis in 1884, she abandoned painting and devoted herself to writing as a critic.

Westermarck began her writing career as a novelist. Her novels can be looked at as an artifact of women's history and the everyday life of upper- and middle-class women. She edited the Swedish-language women's magazine Nutid.

Westermarck also made a significant contribution as a researcher through her cultural and historical works. In her research, she worked beside her brother, Edvard Westermarck, in the British Library. She began her pioneering biographic works in the early 1890s. These works include a series of biographies of female figures. Many of her biographies are on unknown female painters who were "discovered" in the 1980s, including Mathilda Rotkirch (1926). She also wrote about women who were pioneers in their respective fields, including Elisabeth Blomqvist (1916–17), Adelaide Ehrnrooth (1928), and Rosina Heikel (1930).

Westermarck's memoir was published in 1941.

== Selected works ==
- Ur studieboken I–II: Berättelser och utkast, 1890–91
- Framåt. Berättelse, 1894
- George Eliot och den engelska naturalistiska romanen. En litterär studie, 1894
- Nyländska folksagor berättade för ungdom af Helena Westermarck, 1897
- Lifvets seger, 1898
- "Tecken och minnesskrift från adertonhundratalet" I-III, 1900–1911:
  - I I fru Ulrikas hem. Interiör från farmödrarnas tid, 1900
  - II Ljud i natten. Berättelse, 1903
  - III Vandrare. Roman, 1911
- Fredrika Runeberg. En litterär studie, 1904
- Dolda makter. Bilder och hägringar, 1905
- Bönhörelse. En historia, 1909
- Kvinnospår. Kulturbilder från 1800-talets förra del, 1913
- Elisabeth Blomqvist. Hennes Liv och gärning I–II, 1916–17
- Vägvisare. Berättelse, 1922
- Mathilda Rotkirch, Finlands första målarinna. En kulturbild, 1926
- Adelaïde Ehrnrooth. Kvinnospår i finländskt kulturliv, 1928
- Finlands första kvinnliga läkare Rosina Heikel, 1930
- Tre konstnärinnor. Fanny Churberg, Maria Wiik och Sigrid af Forselles, 1937
- Mina levnadsminnen, 1941

== Gallery ==
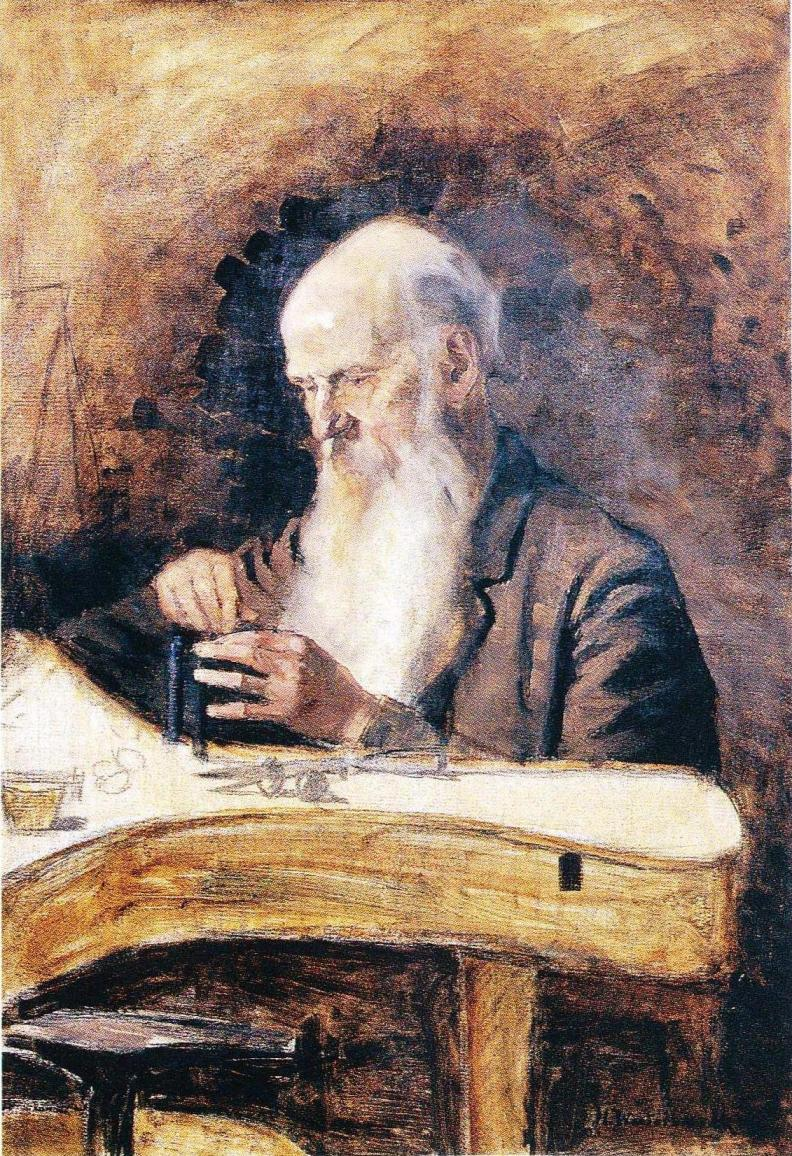
Portrait of watchmaker Anders Wilhelm Felixzon, unknown date

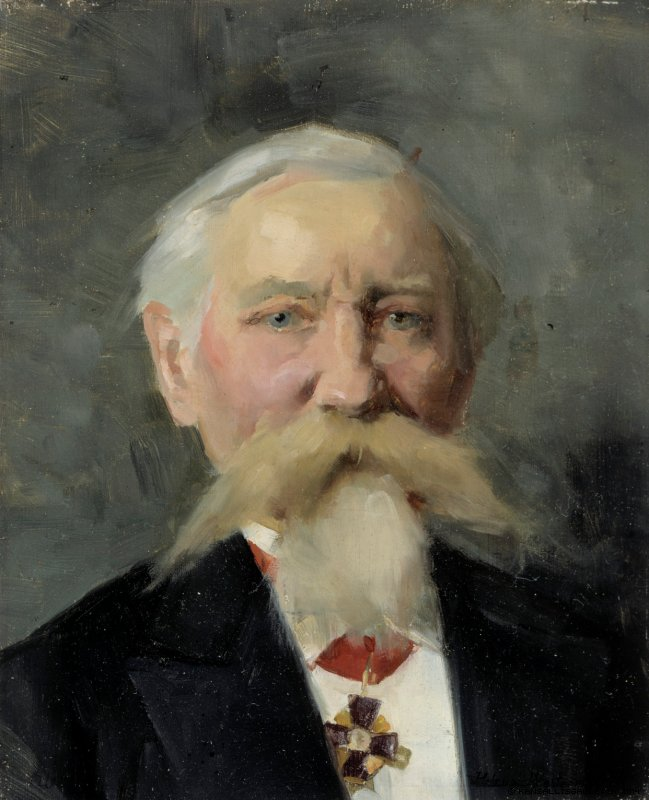
General Albert Westermarck, c. 1880

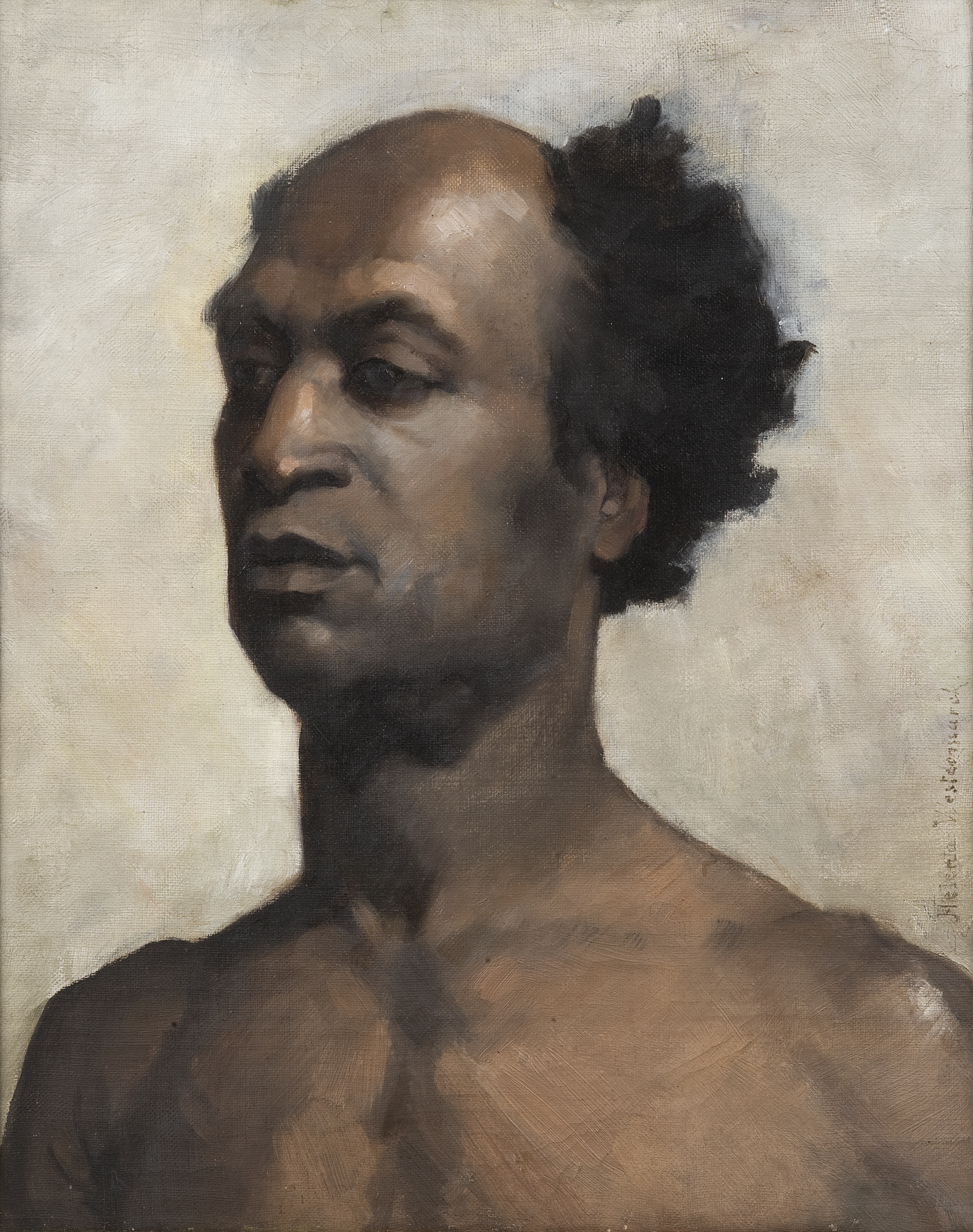
Abyssinian, 1880

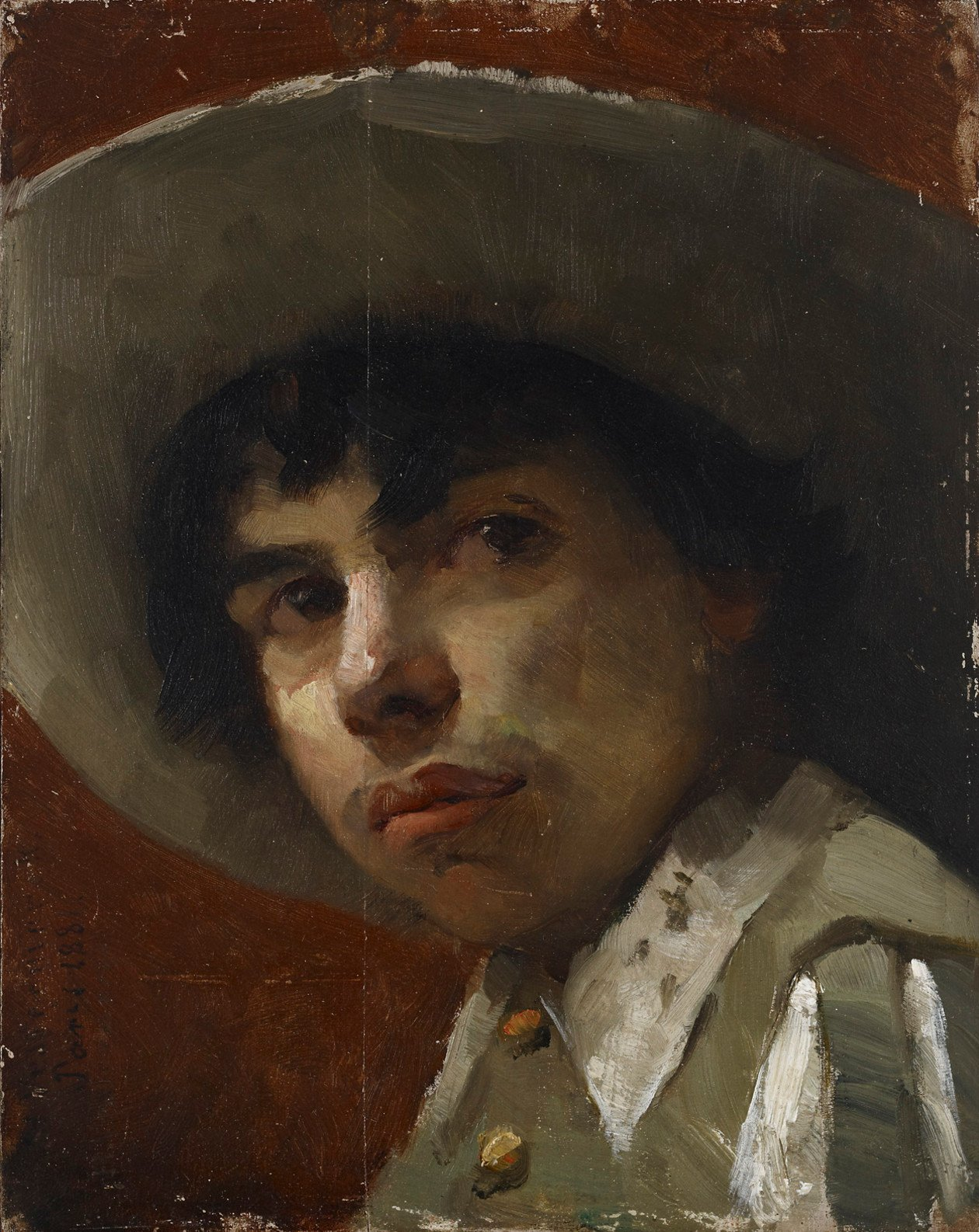
Colarossi's Son, 1881

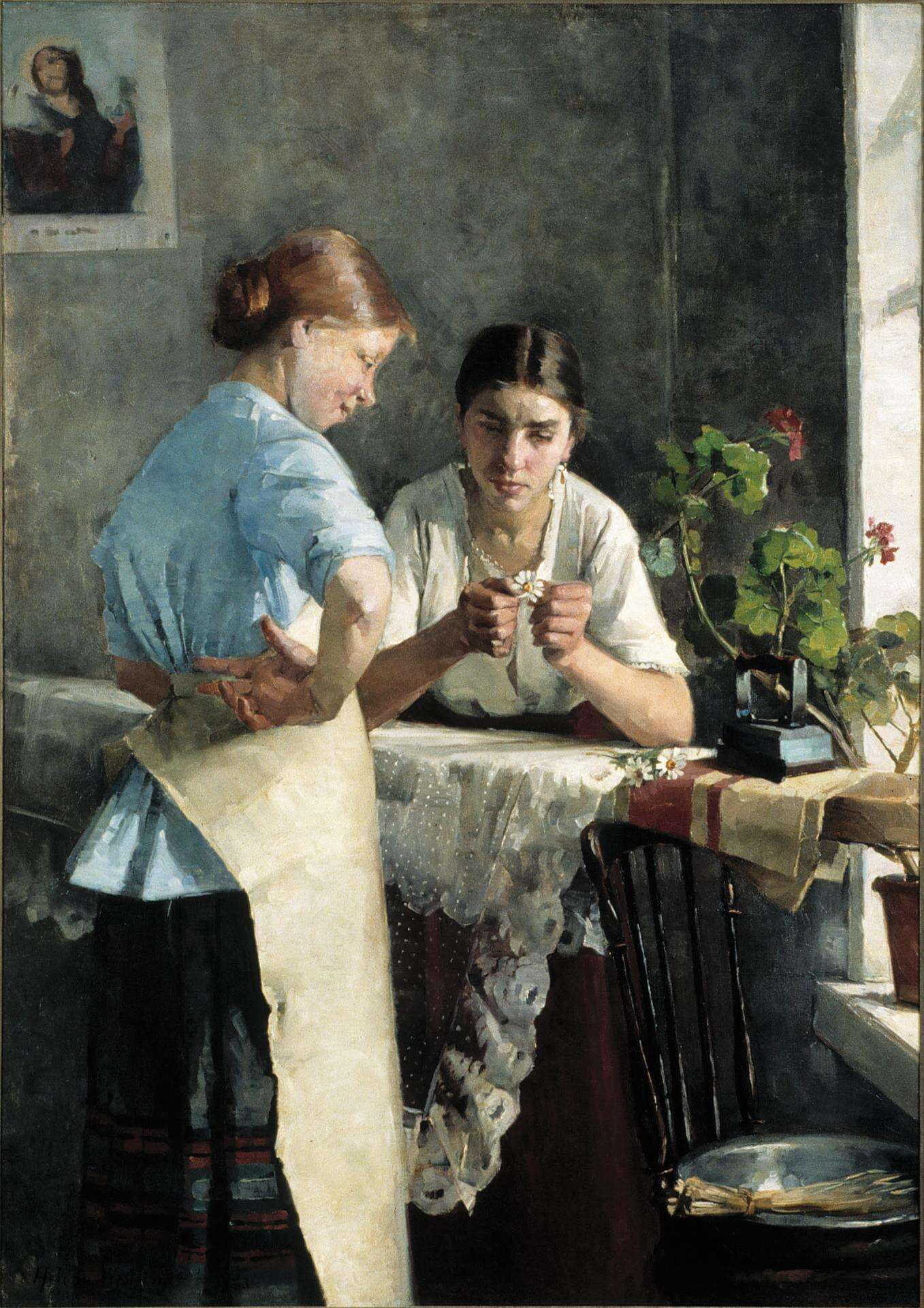
Ironesses; An Important Question, 1883

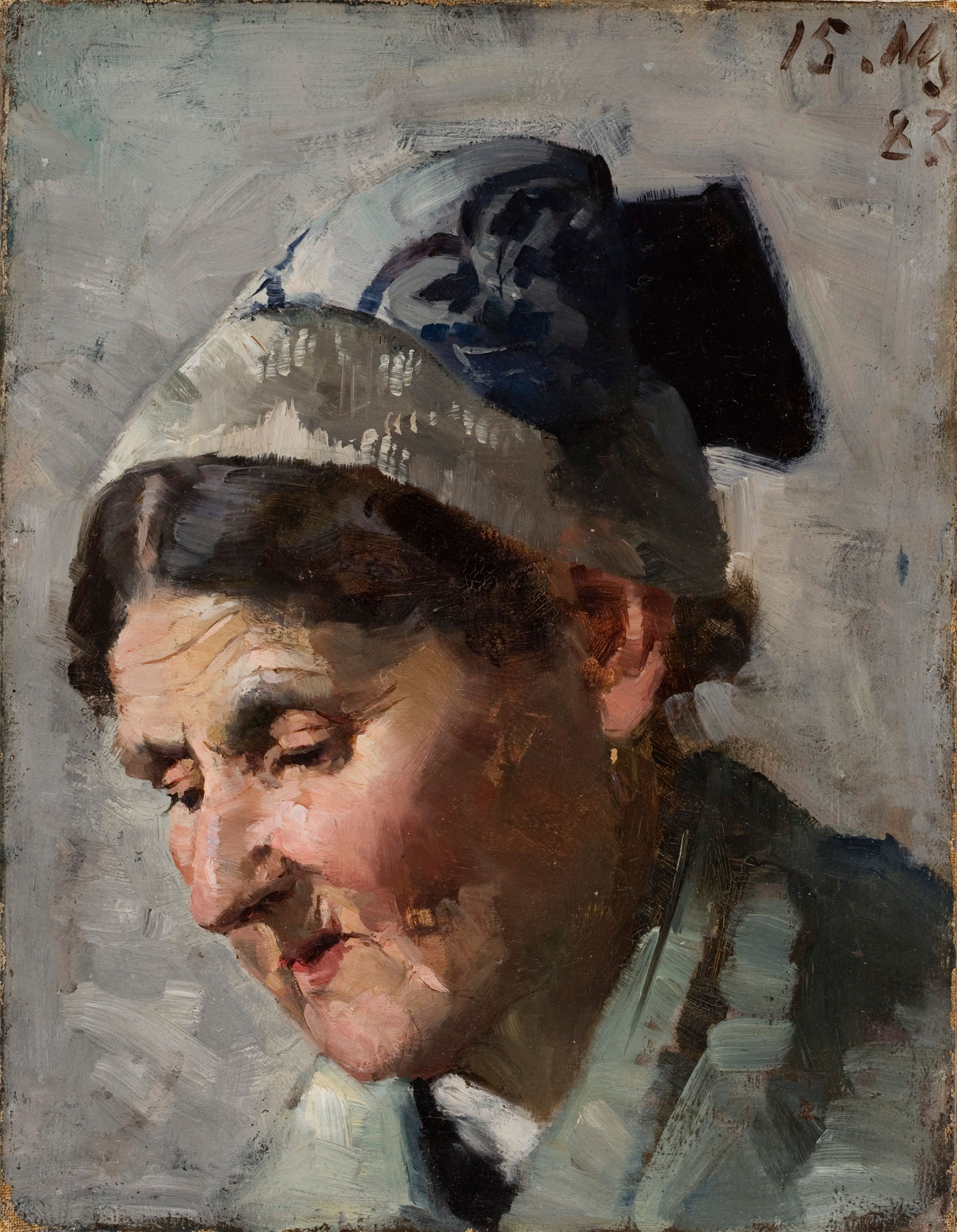
An Old Woman, 1883

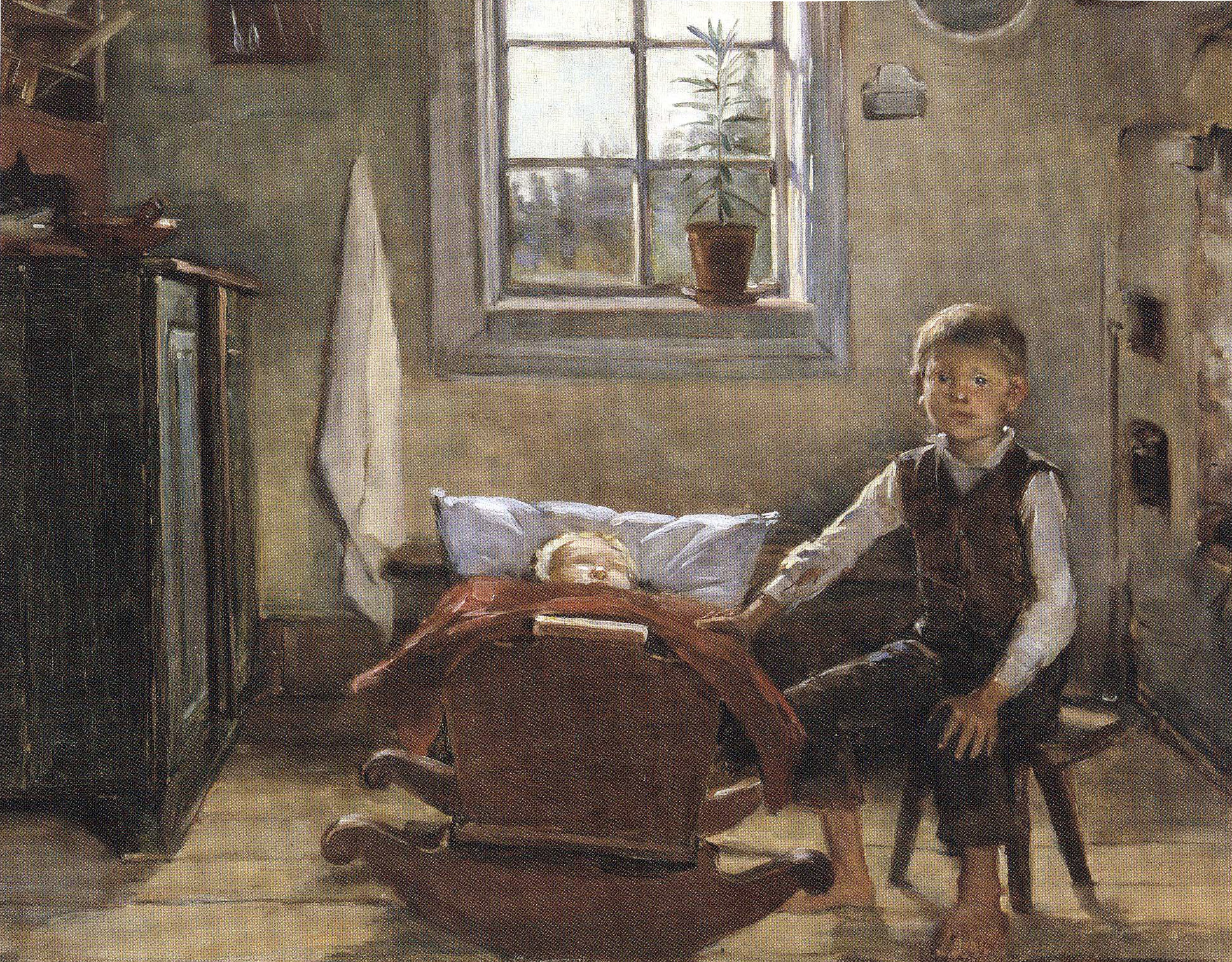
Children in a Cottage, 1892

== See also ==
- Golden Age of Finnish Art
- Finnish art
