= Adolf von Becker =

Finnish artist (1831–1909)

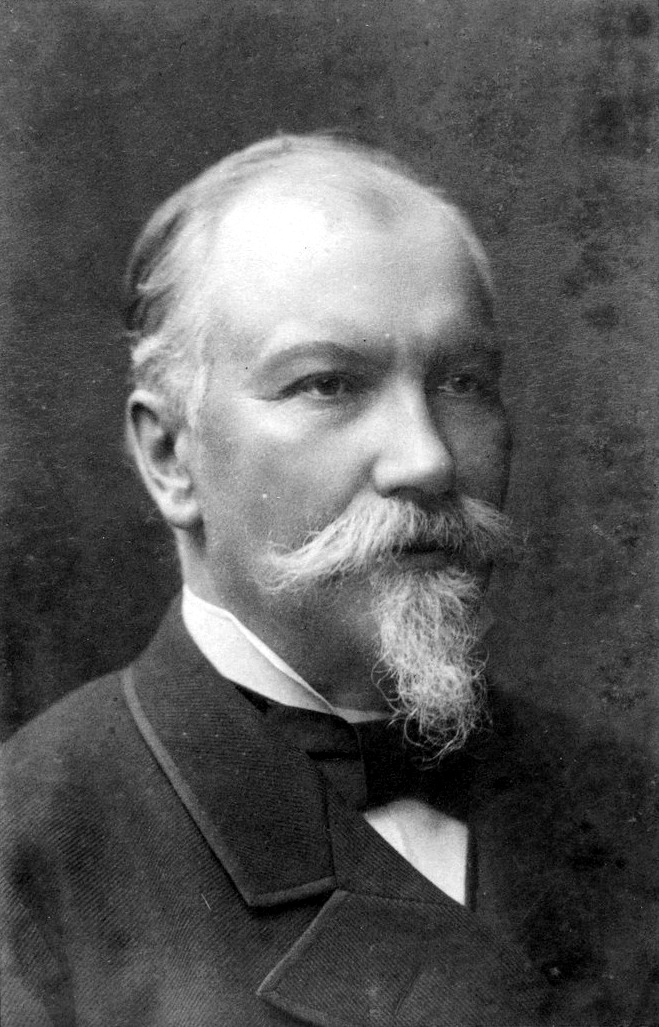
- Born: 14 August 1831; Helsinki, Grand Duchy of Finland
- Died: 23 August 1909 (aged 78); Vevey, Switzerland
- Known for: Painting

Adolf von Becker (14 August 1831 – 23 August 1909) was a Finnish genre painter and art professor of German descent. He was one of the first Finnish artists to study in Paris, who taught many of the young artists of the Golden Age of Finnish Art.

== Biography ==
Becker was born in Helsinki, where he began his artistic studies at the newly founded Finnish Art Society Drawing School; he also studied law. In 1853, he completed his law degree and became a trainee at the Court of Appeals in Turku. While there, he continued to make drawing expeditions into the countryside and made the acquaintance of Robert Wilhelm Ekman, who encouraged him to study at the Royal Danish Academy of Fine Arts. He took Ekman's advice and graduated there in 1856.

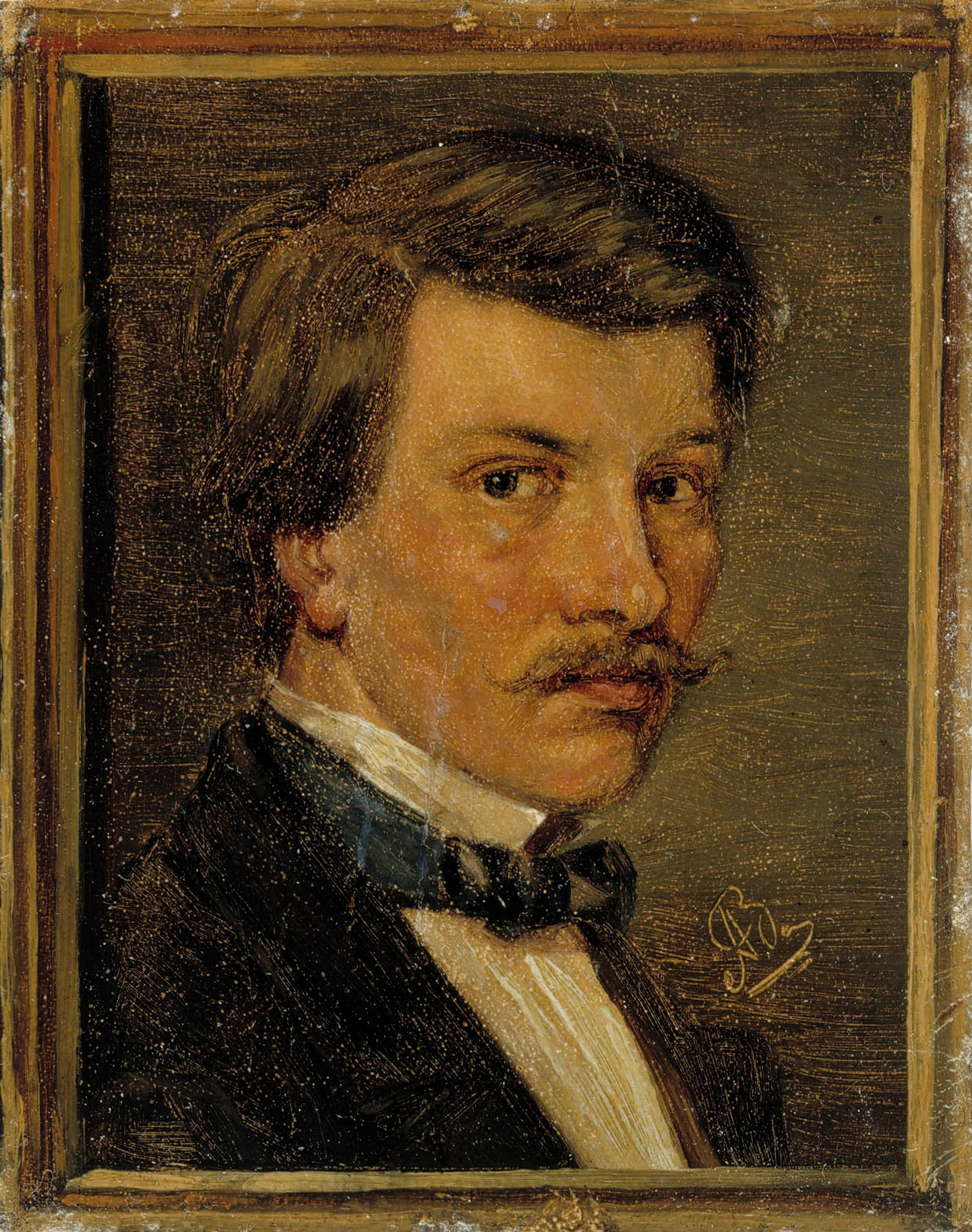
Self-Portrait, 1860s

In 1858, he received a recommendation to study with Thomas Couture in Paris, but was overwhelmed by the huge cosmopolitan city and left to enroll at the Kunstakademie Düsseldorf instead. The course of study proved to be disappointing however, so he returned to Paris to try again. When Couture closed his teaching studios in 1860, Becker applied to and was accepted at the École des Beaux-Arts, where he studied with Felix-Joseph Barrias, Ernest Hébert, Leon Cogniet and Leon Bonnat.

In 1864, he travelled to Spain on a scholarship and made copies of the Old Masters in Madrid. Later, he visited Italy and, on his return to France, he rented a studio outside Paris from Alfred Wahlberg, who he had met in Düsseldorf. In 1868, he returned to Finland to take a position at the University of Helsinki drawing school; replacing the late Magnus von Wright. He was appointed a Professor there in 1879.

=== Private teacher ===
Meanwhile, in 1872, he had started his own private drawing school. He was known as a very strict teacher. Studies there were however interrupted by his frequent travels. Among his best-known students were Albert Edelfelt, Helene Schjerfbeck, Elin Danielson-Gambogi, Helena Westermarck and Akseli Gallen-Kallela.

As the 19th century drew to a close, he came under increasing criticism from the younger generation of artists for being too conservative. This came to a head at the Exposition Universelle in 1889, when the older generation, represented by Becker, Walter Runeberg and Berndt Lindholm, came into open confrontation with a younger faction led by Ville Vallgren and Albert Edelfelt. Soon after, disagreements developed between him and the Finnish Art Association and he began to exhibit independently.

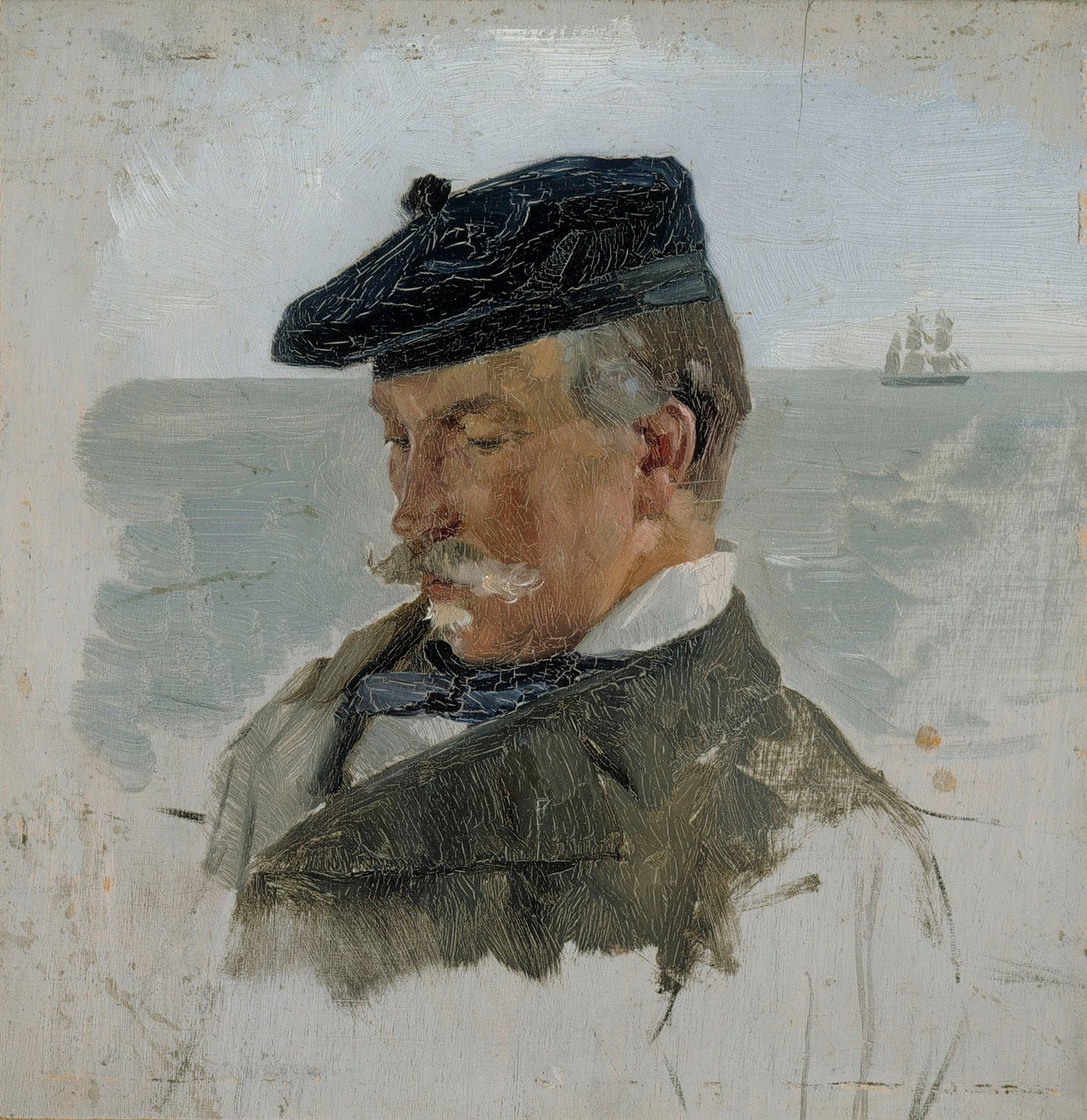
Portrait sketch by Albert Edelfelt

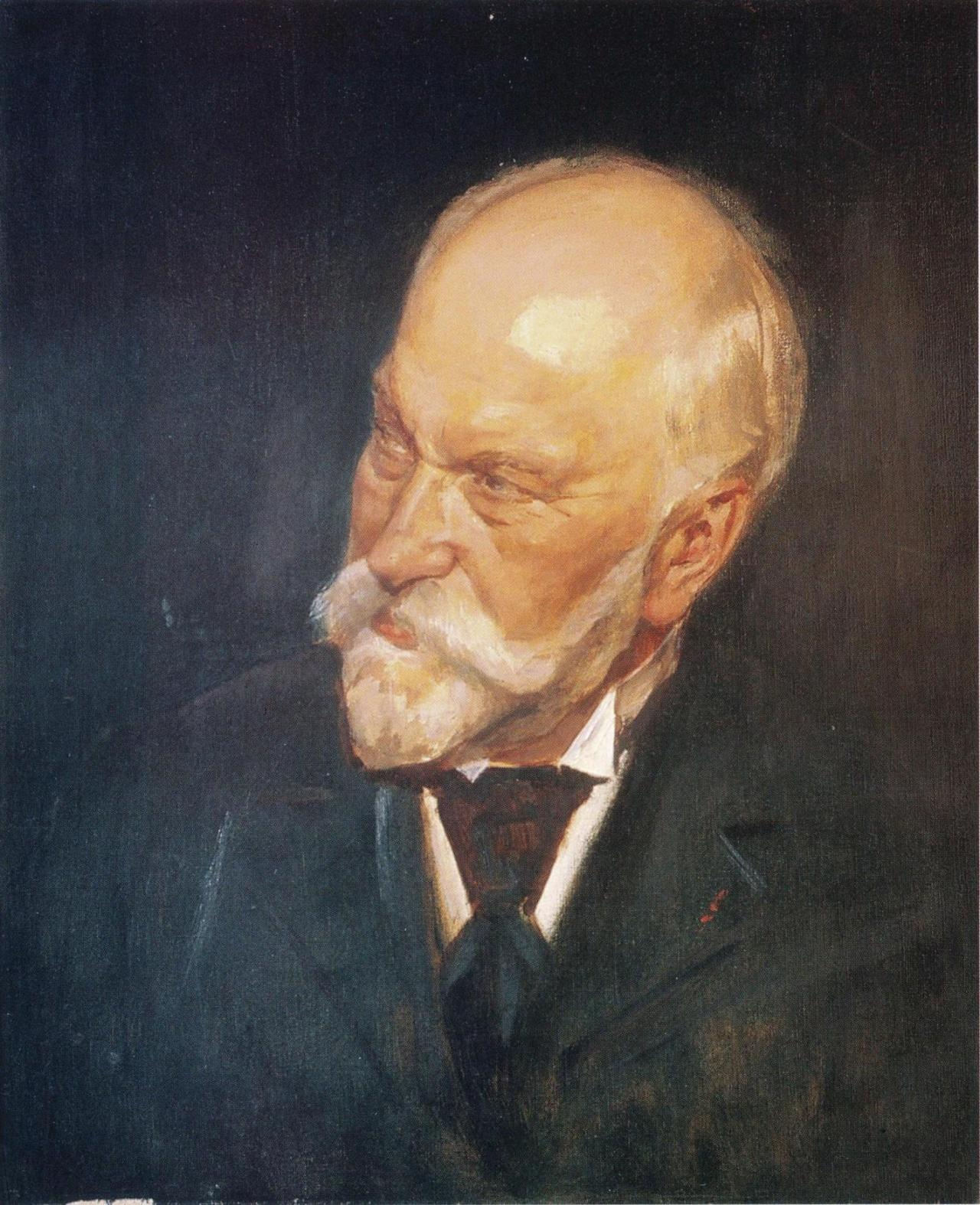
Portrait by William Gromme, 1901

He retired from the university in 1892 and returned to Paris. As he grew older, he found the winters there too cold, so he moved to Nice in 1904. He died while vacationing in Vevey, Switzerland, aged 78.

== Works ==
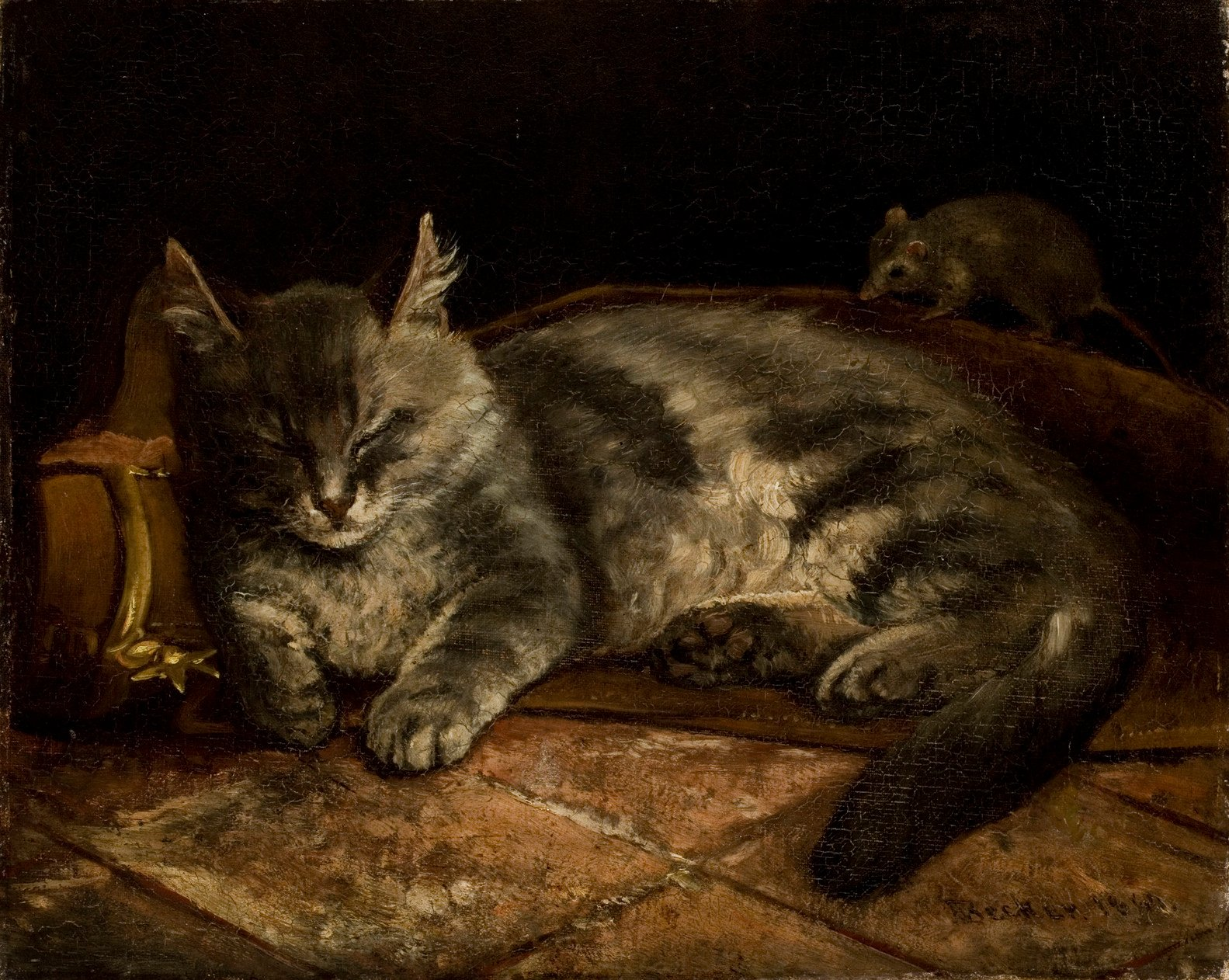
Sleeping Grey Cat and a Rat, 1864

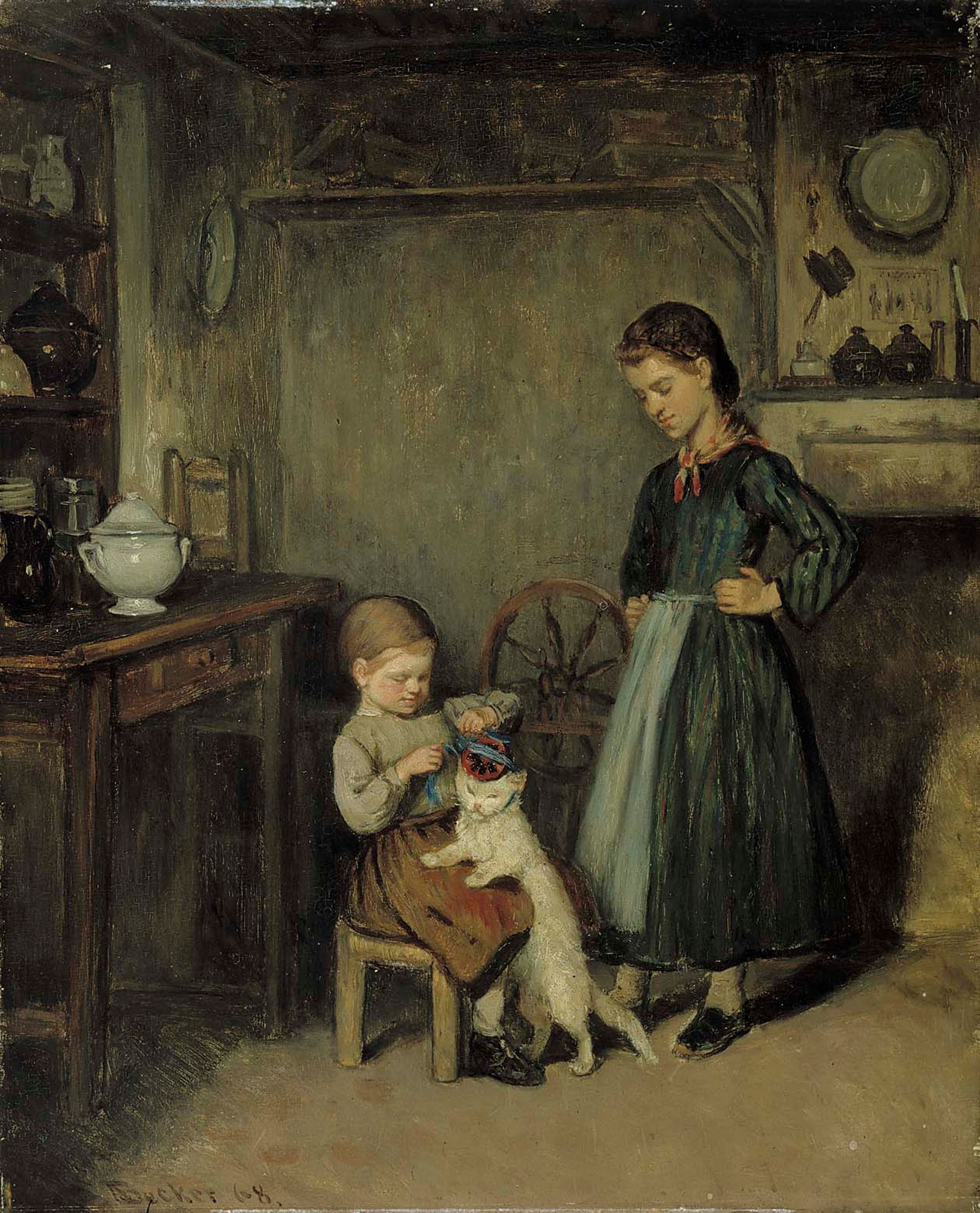
A French Interior, 1868

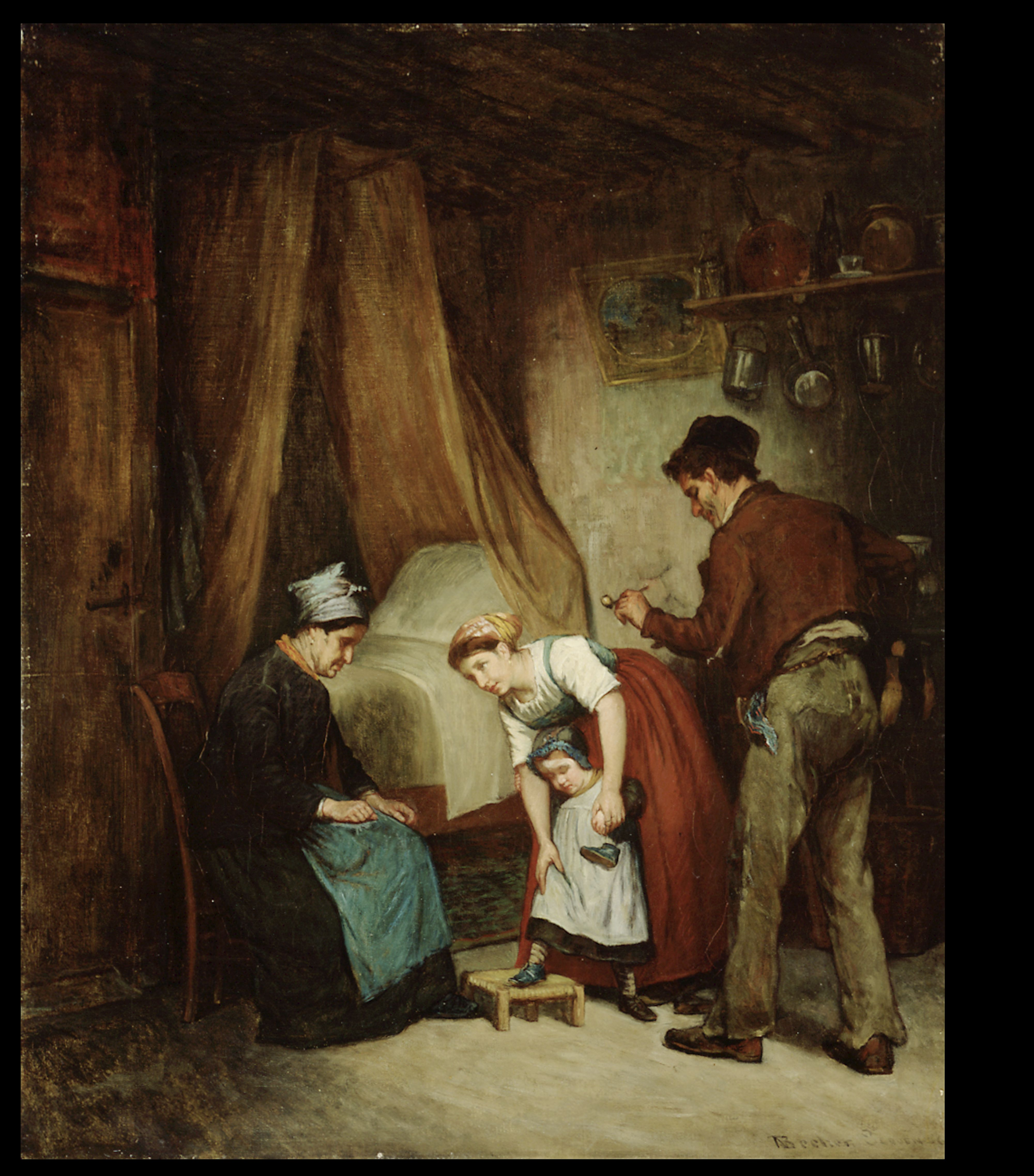
A French Cobbler, 1868

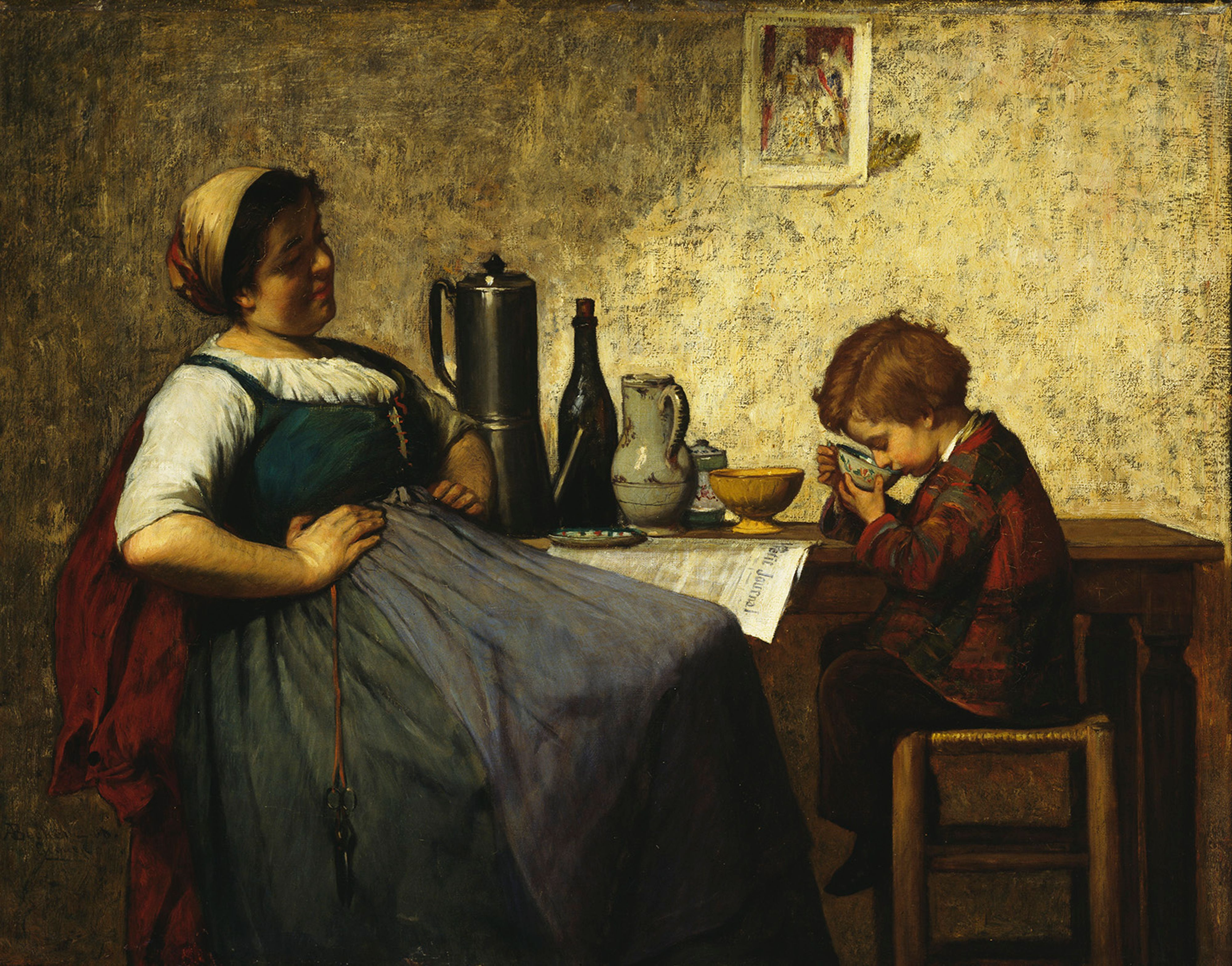
Maternal Joy, 1868

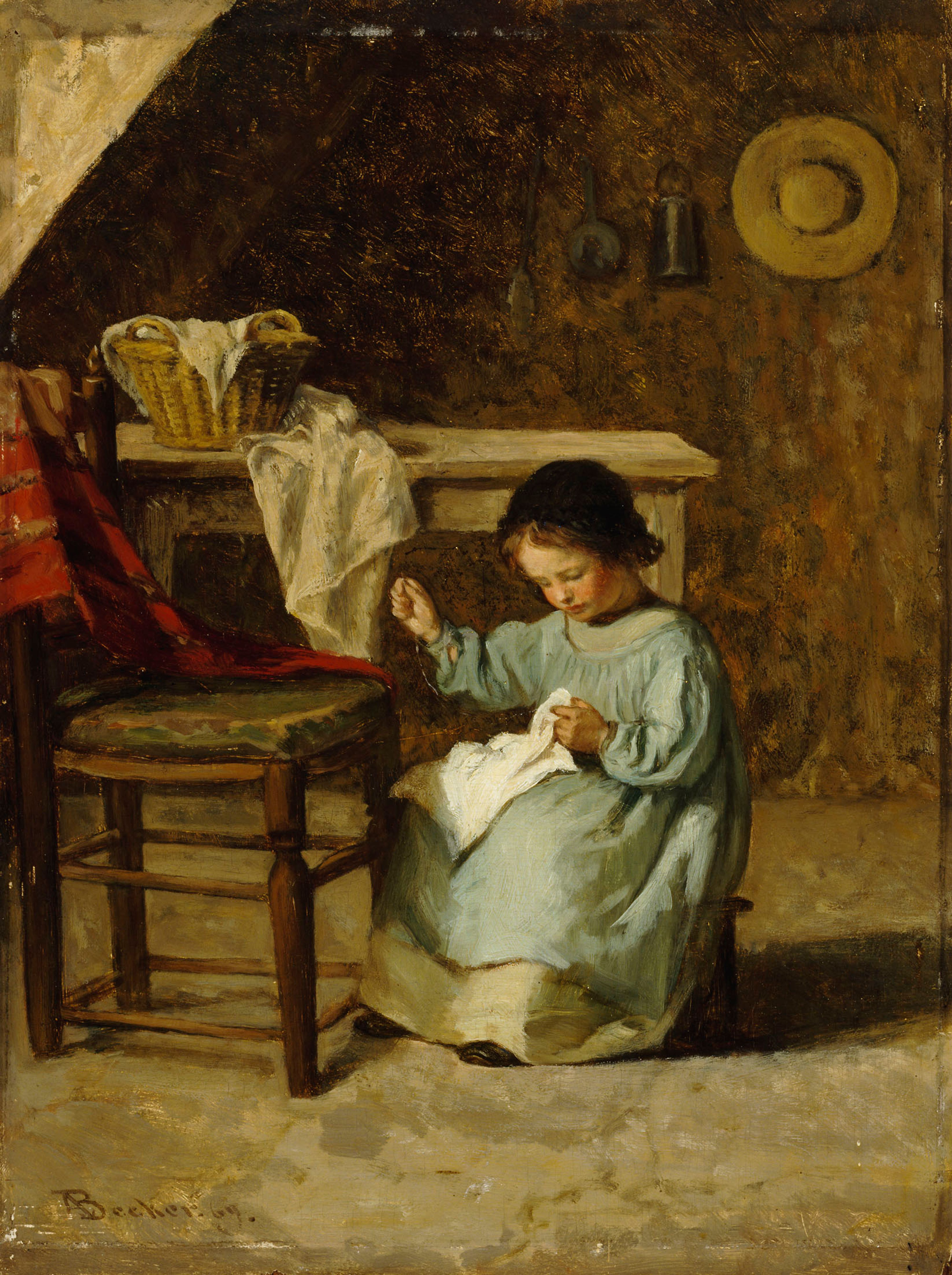
A Girl Sewing, 1869

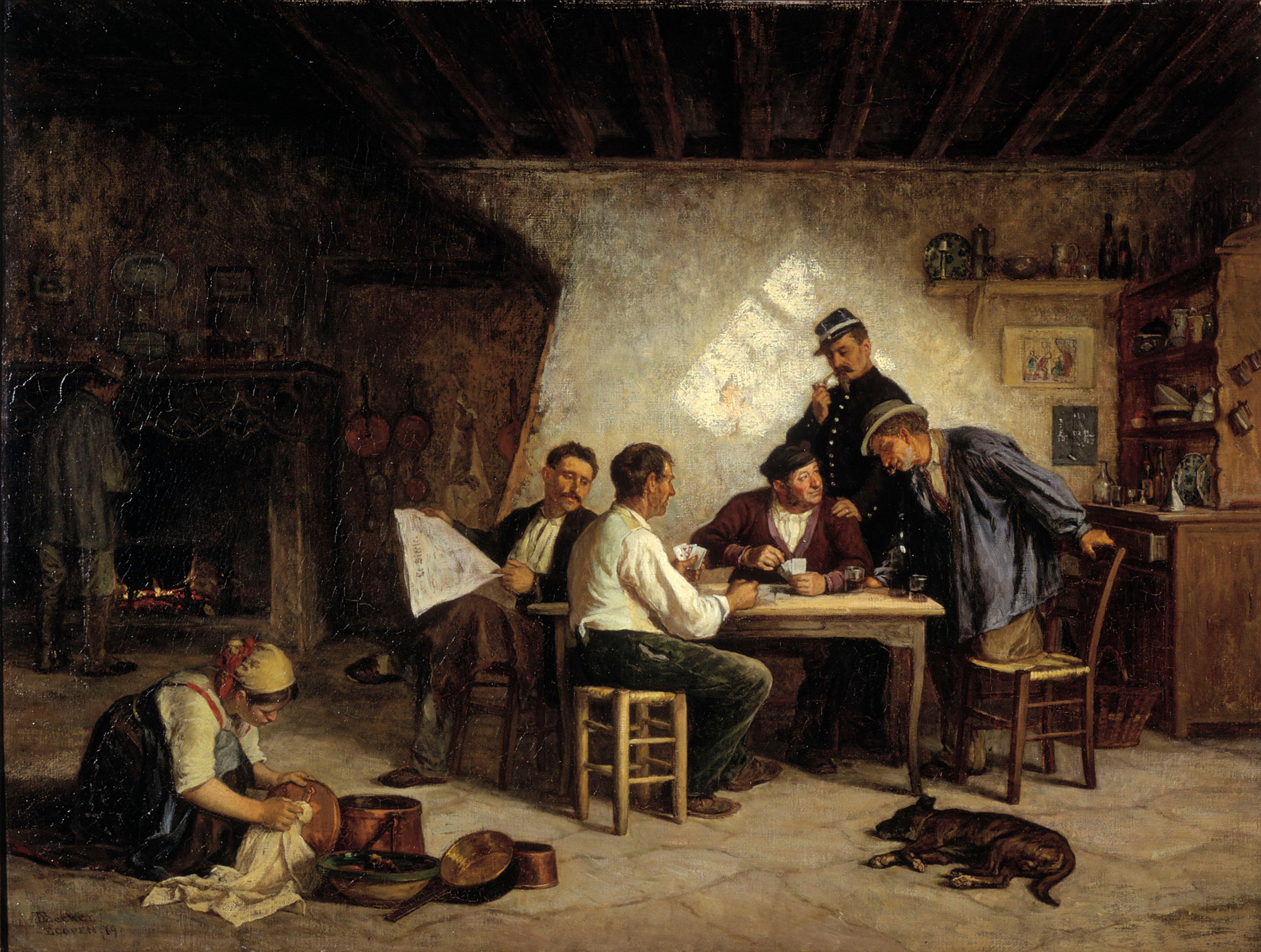
A Game of Piquet, 1869

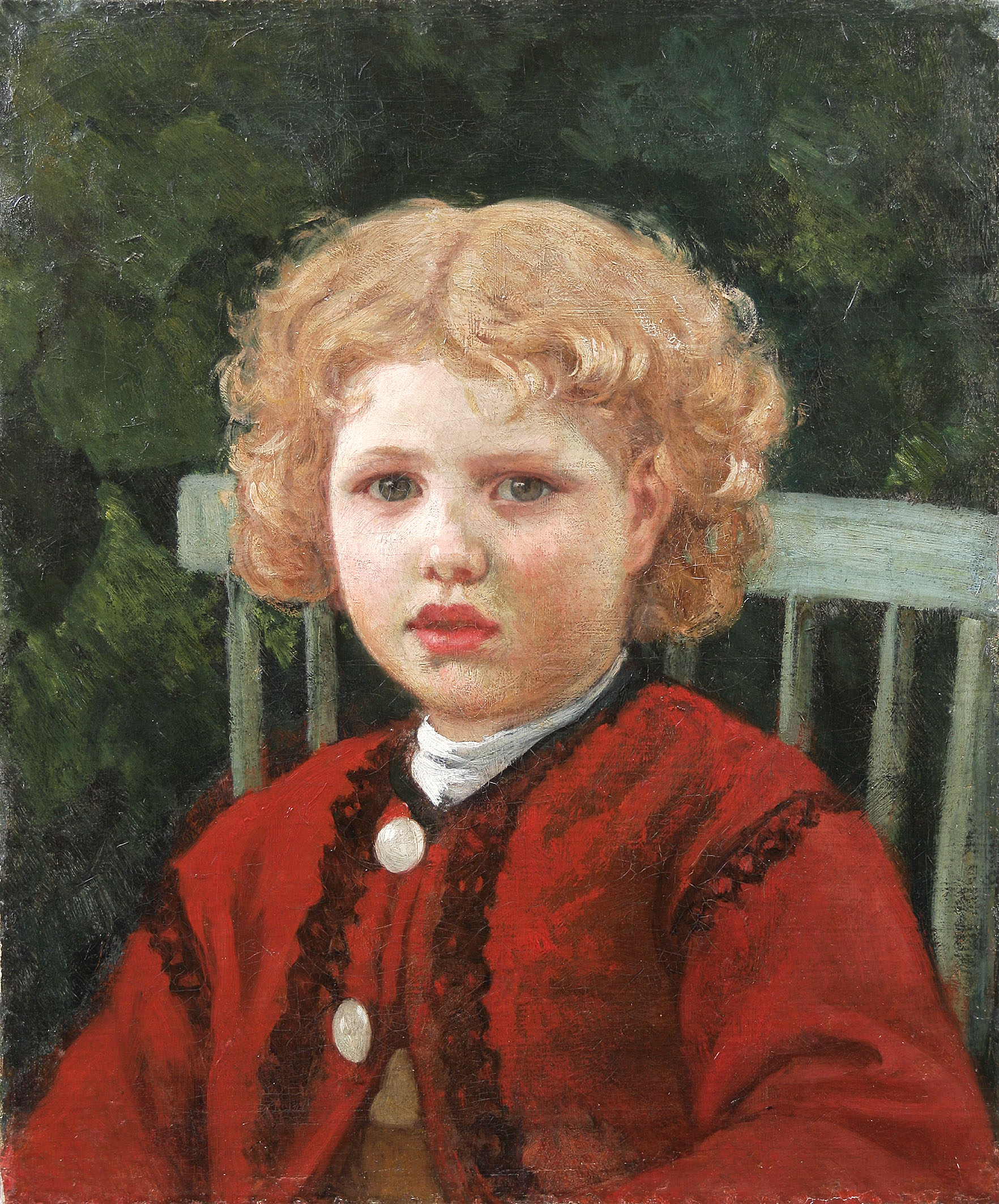
Curly-Haired Girl, 1869

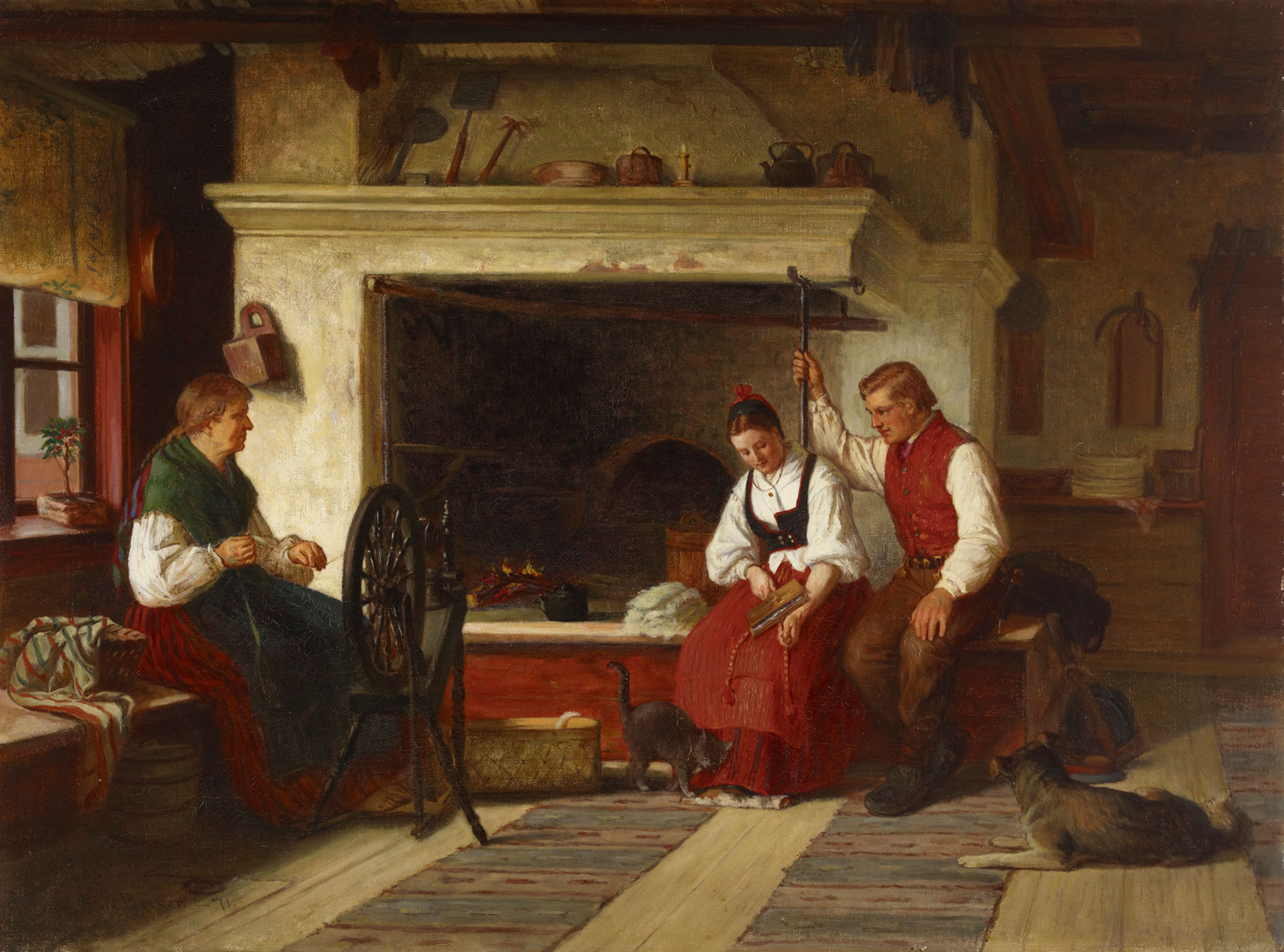
By the Hearth, an Ostrobothnian Courting Scene, 1871

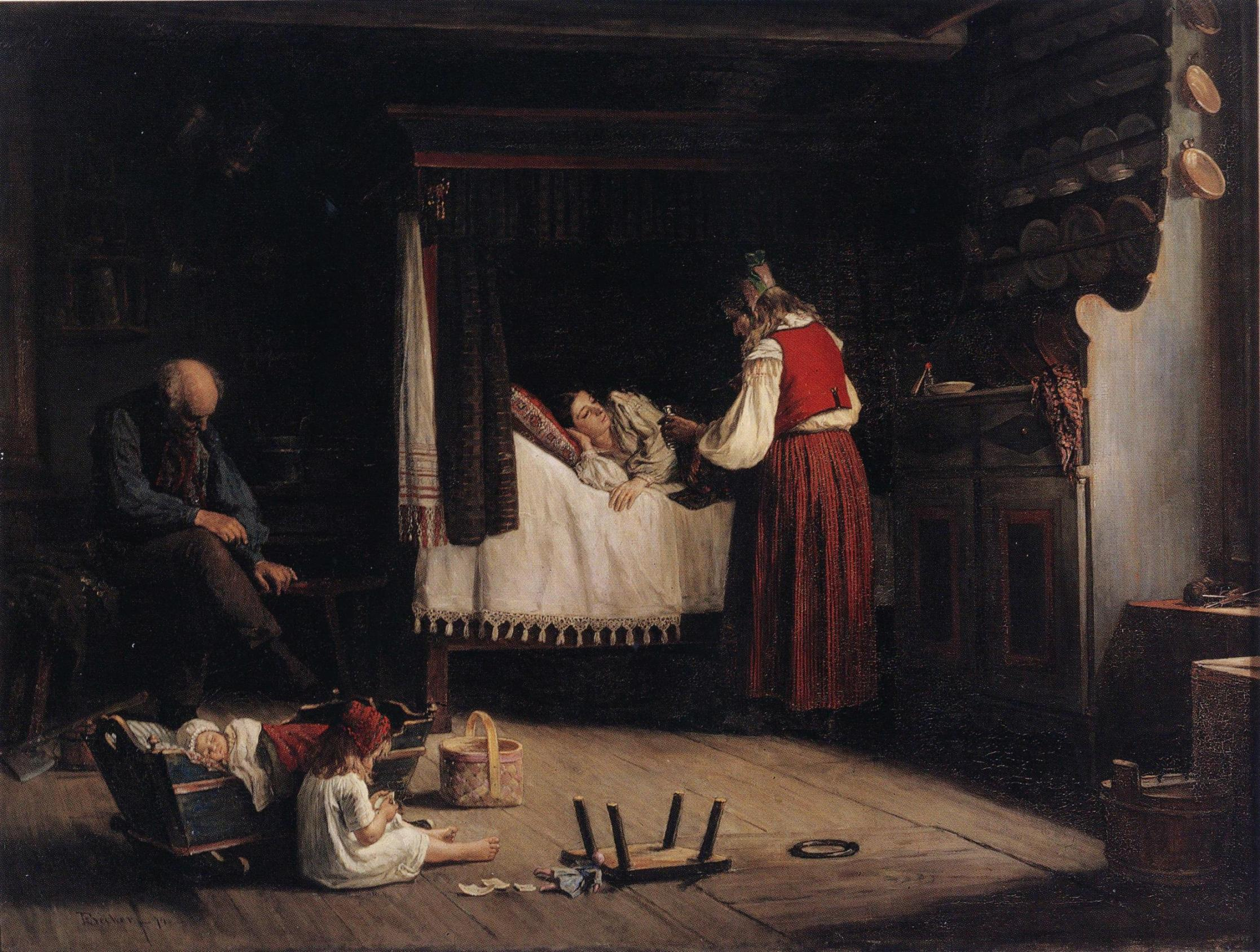
By the Sickbed, 1874

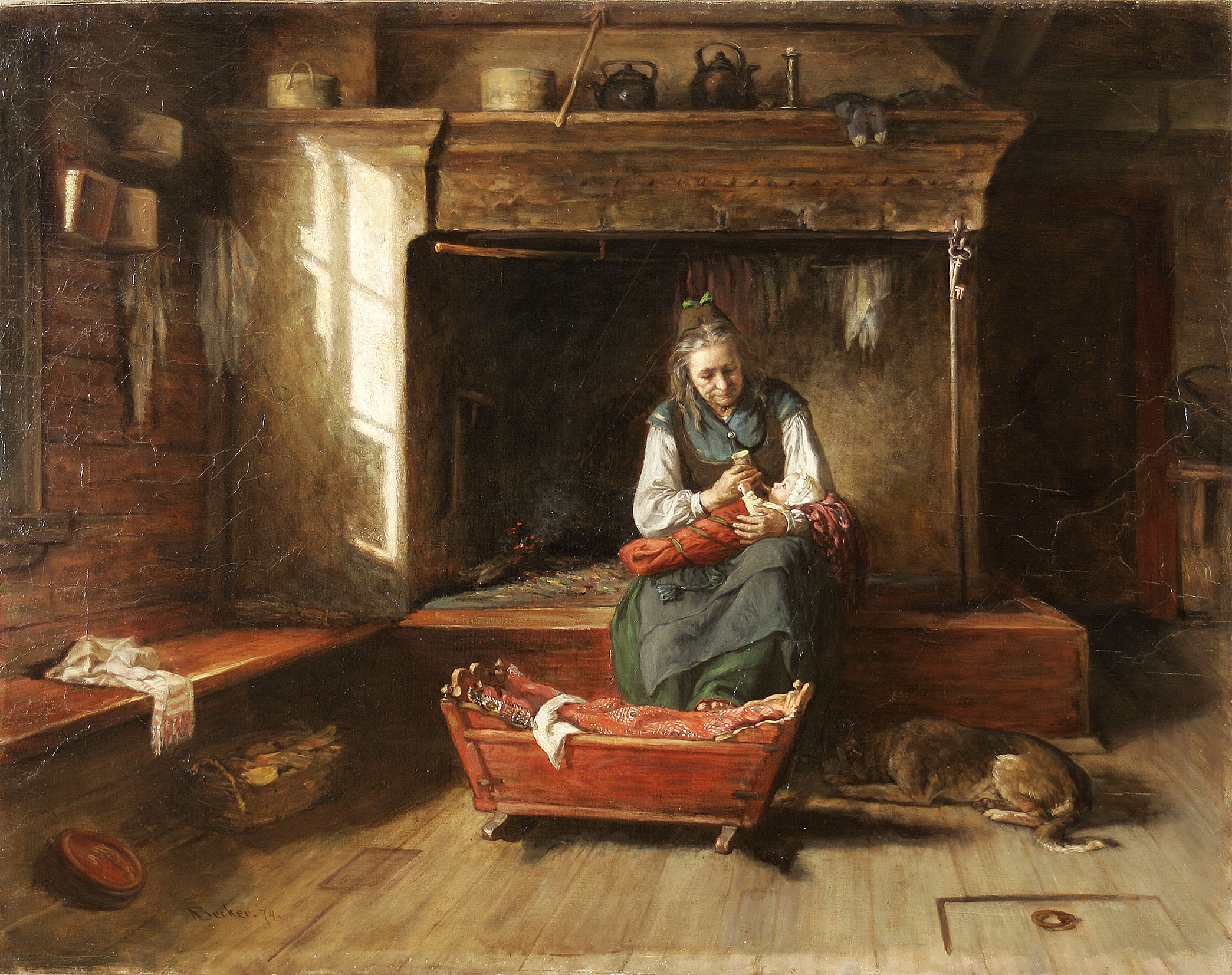
Little One Being Fed, 1874

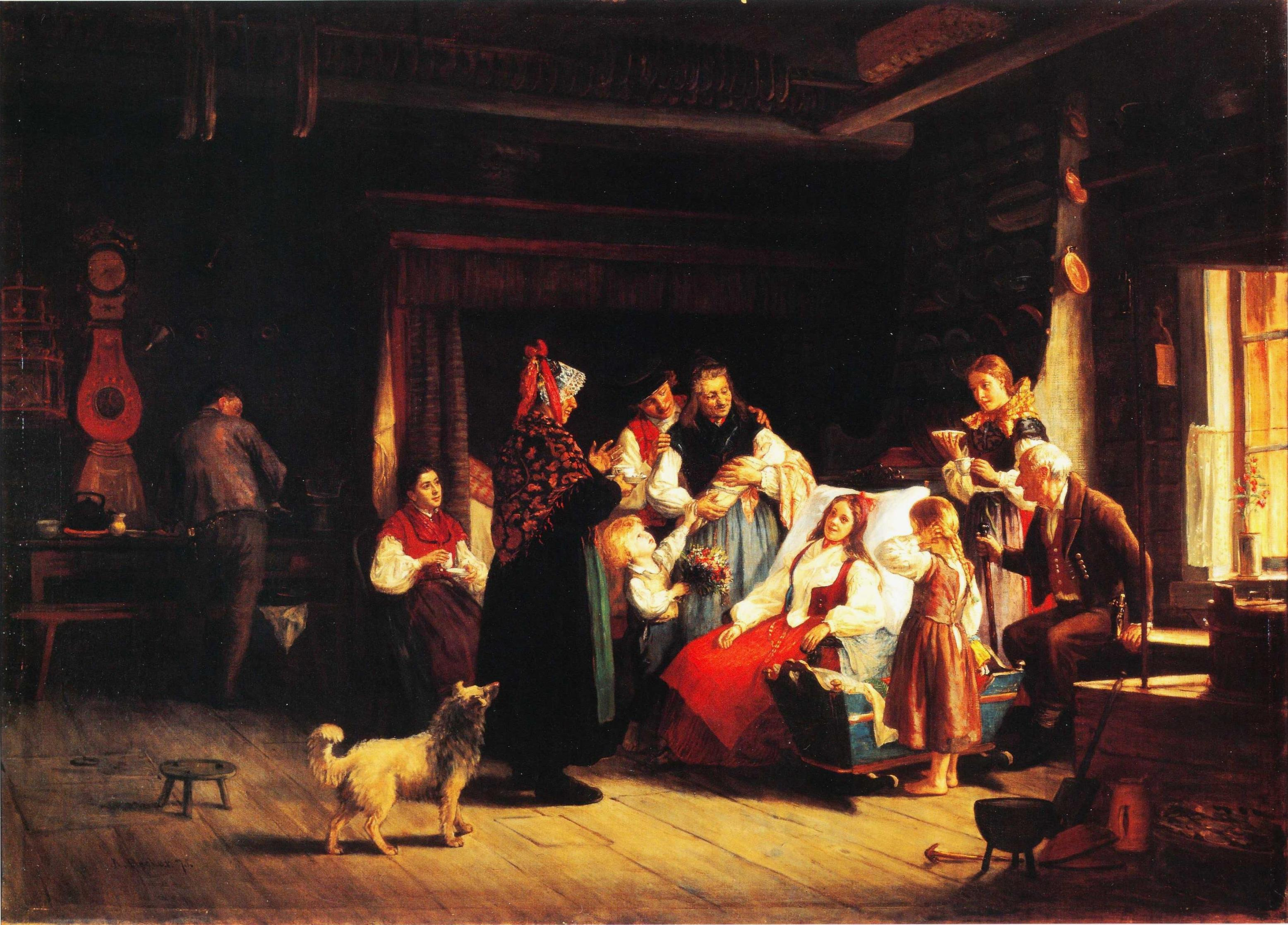
Newborn, 1875

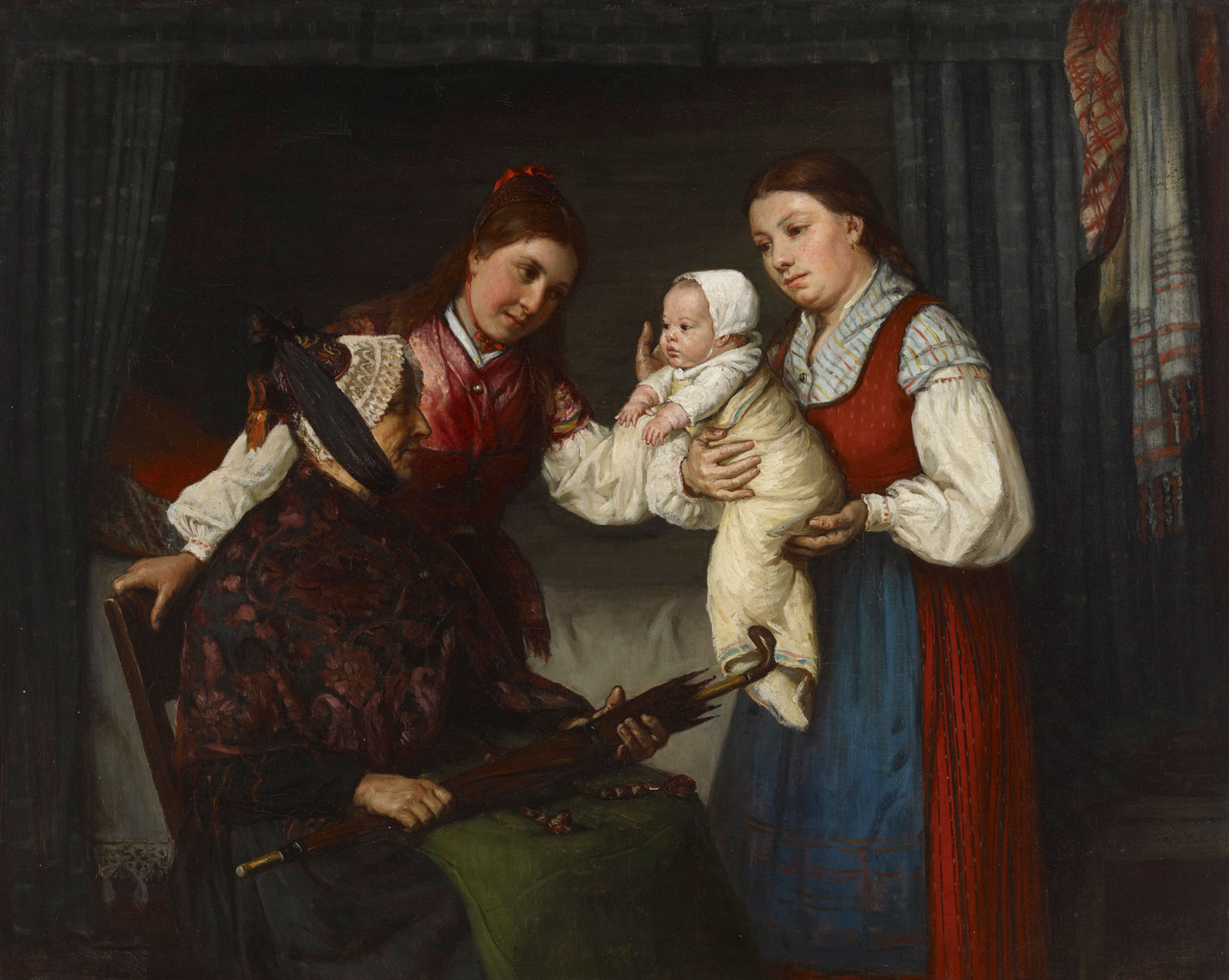
Presenting the Baby, 1875

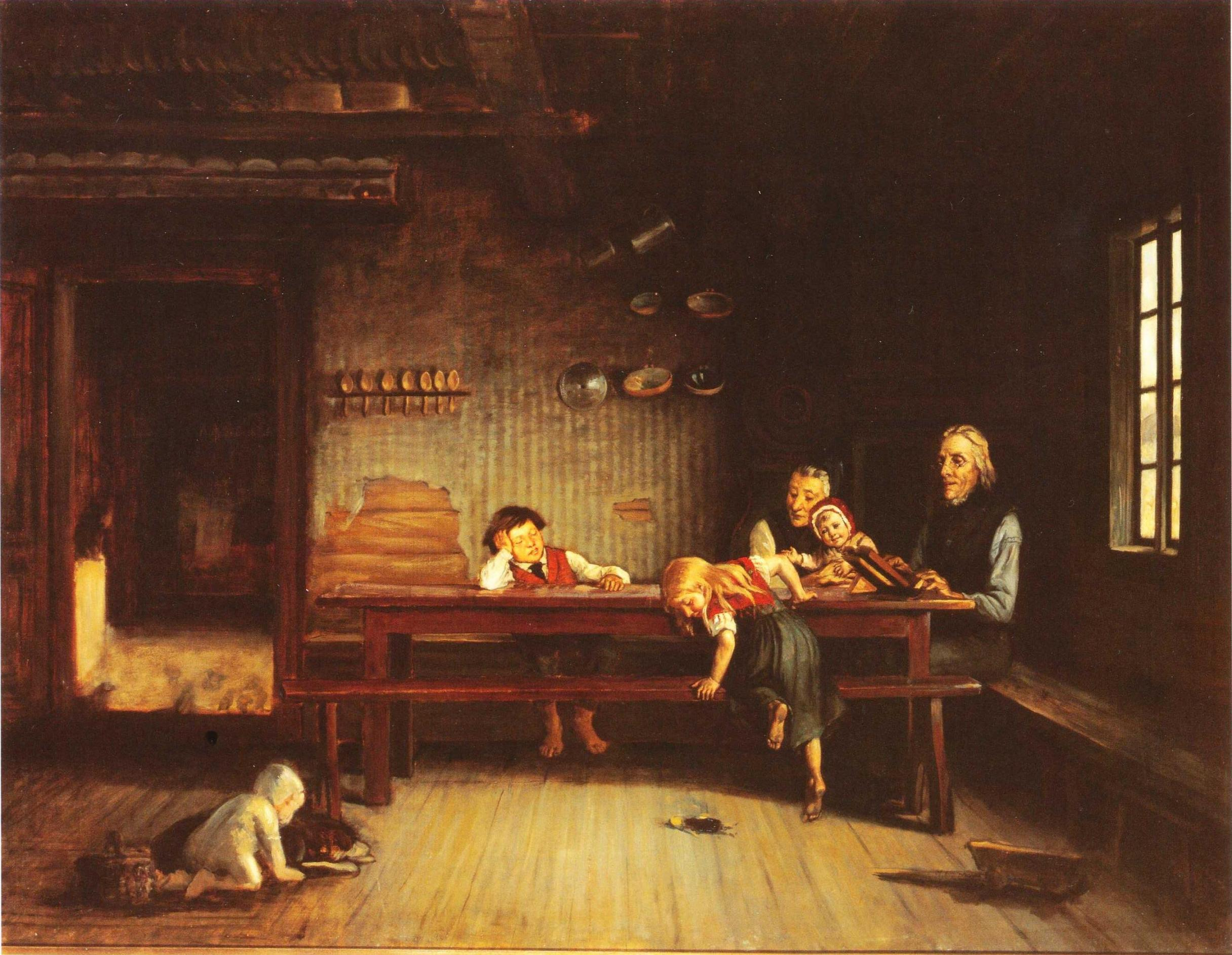
Sunday Morning in a Farmstead, 1870s

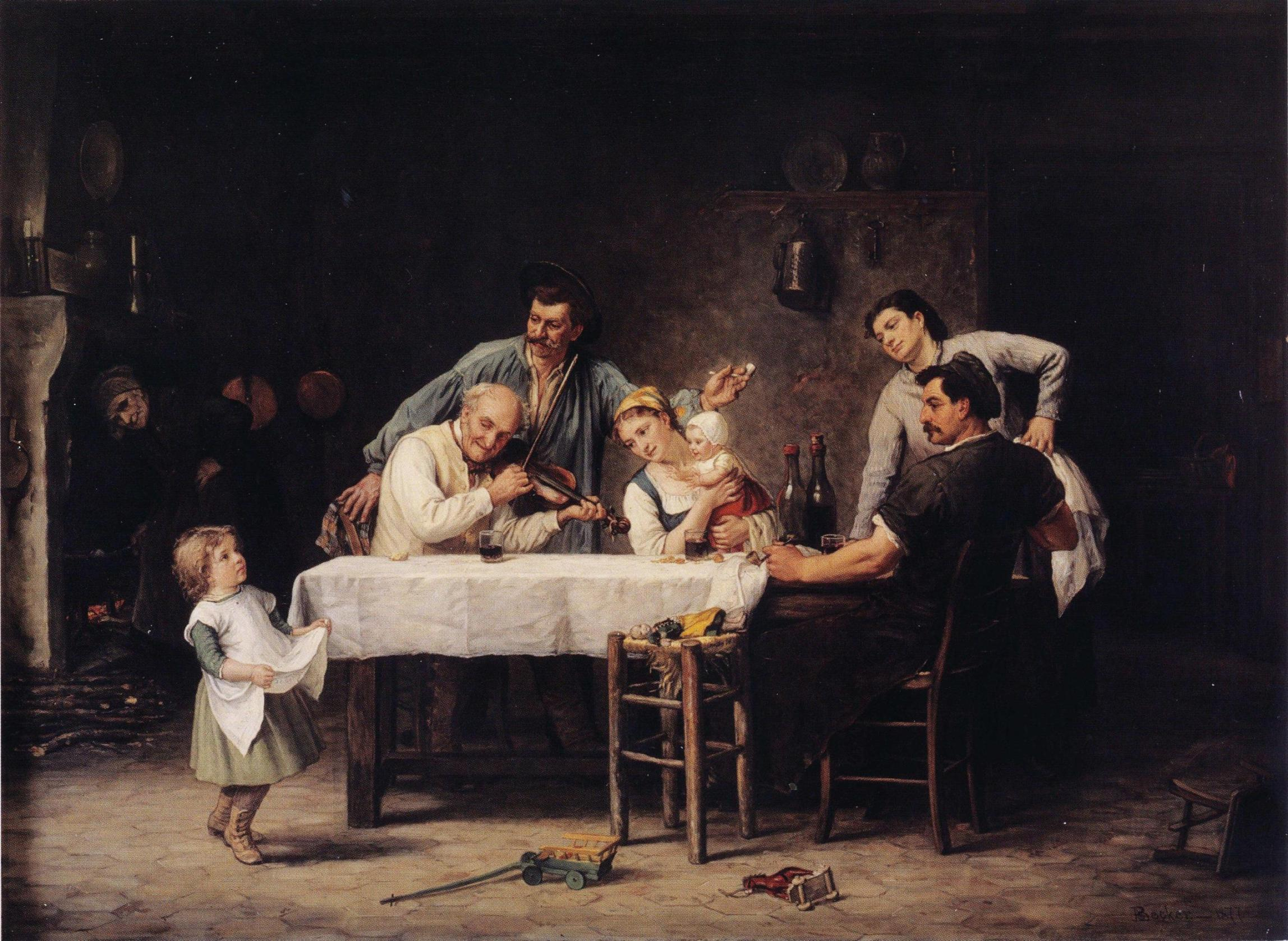
After Dinner, 1877

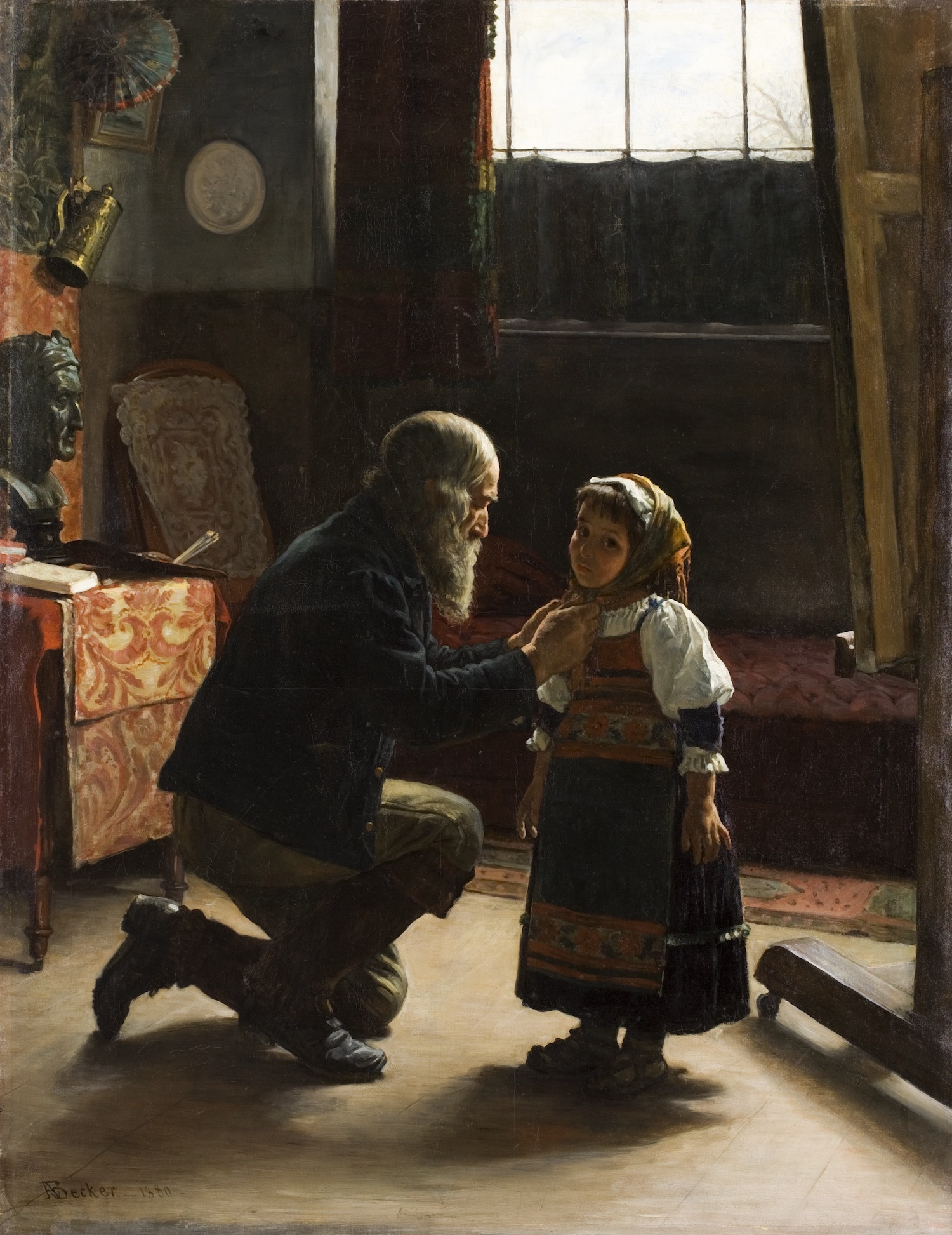
After Modeling, 1880

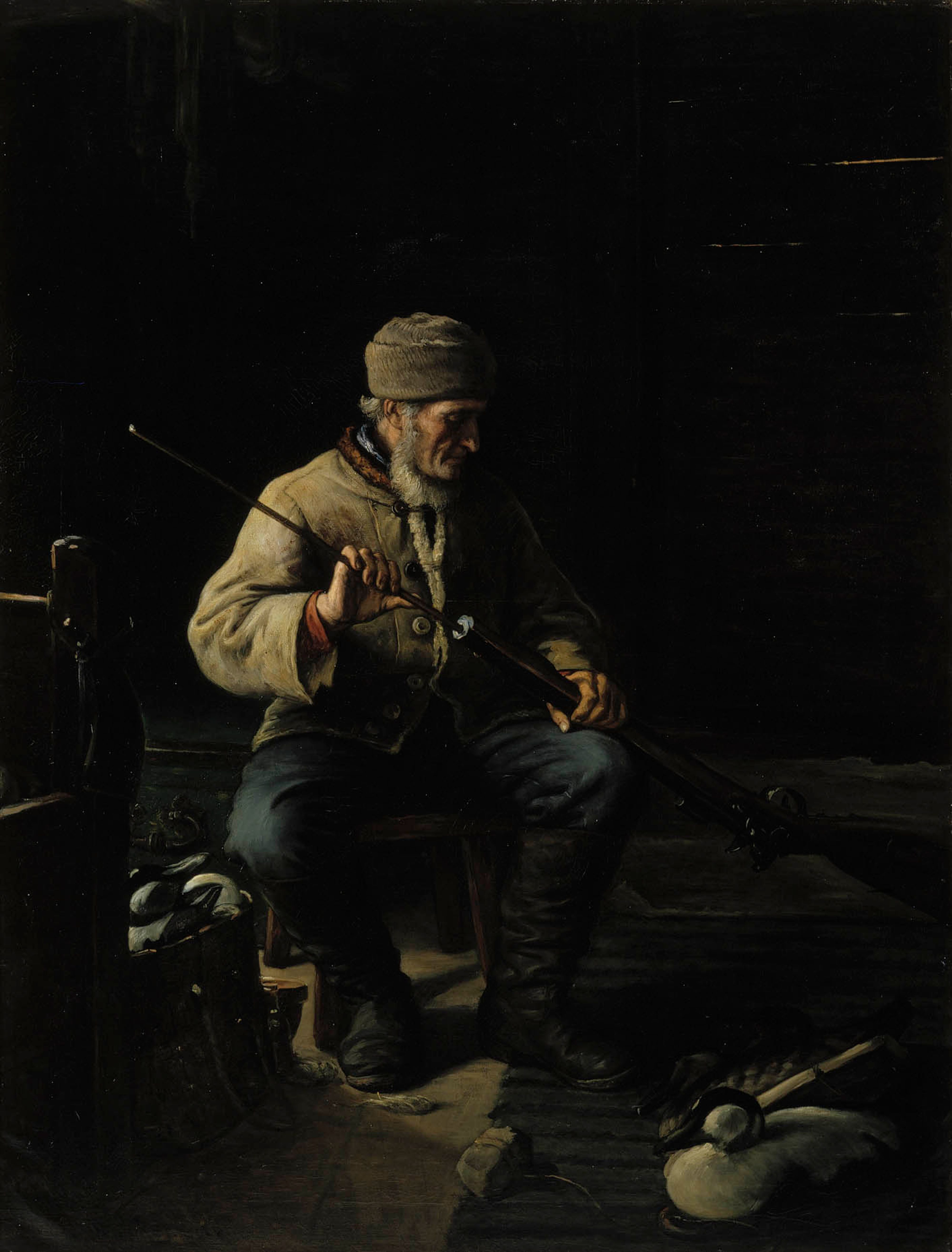
Before the Chase, 1880

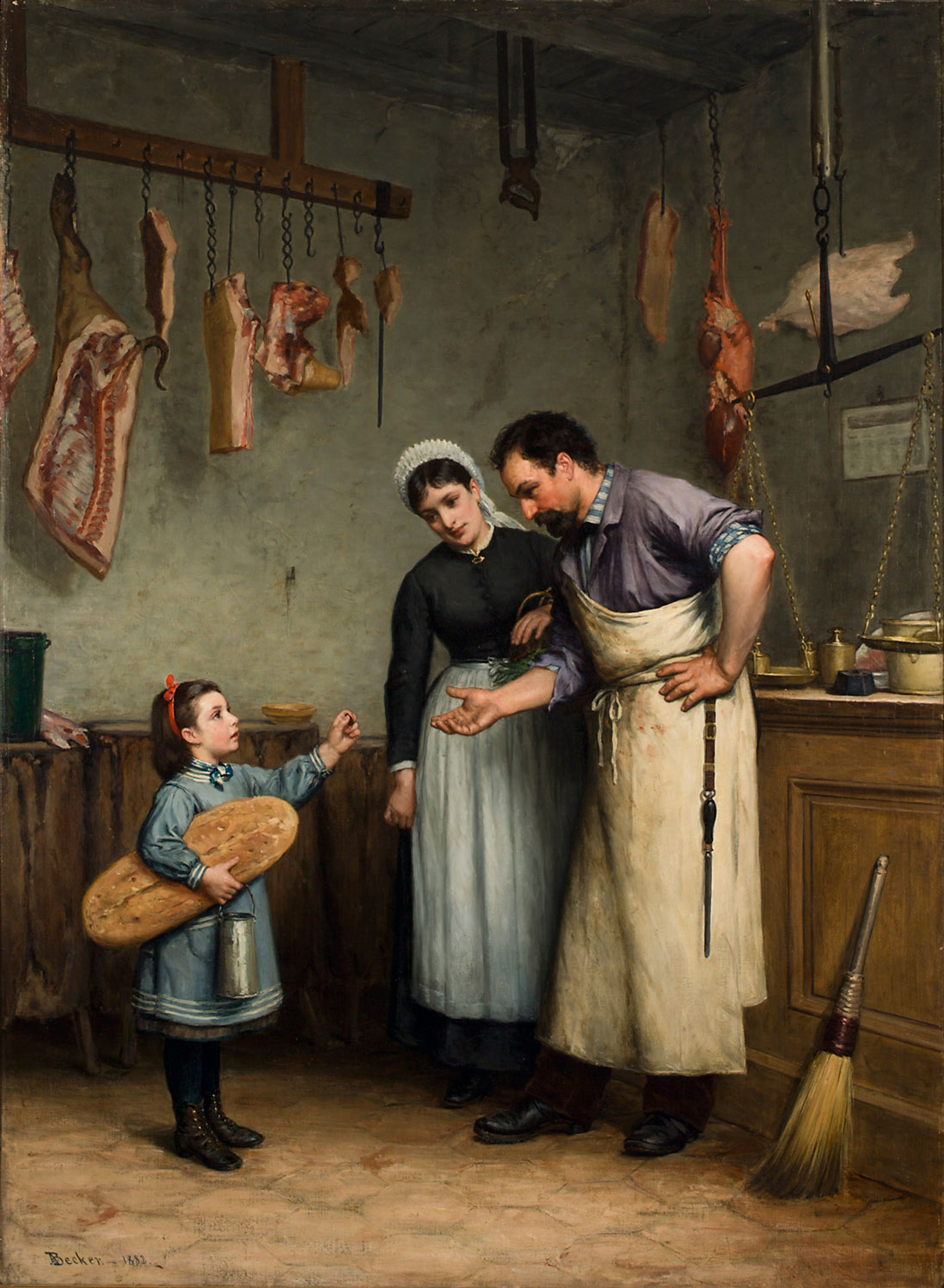
Something for the Cat, 1882

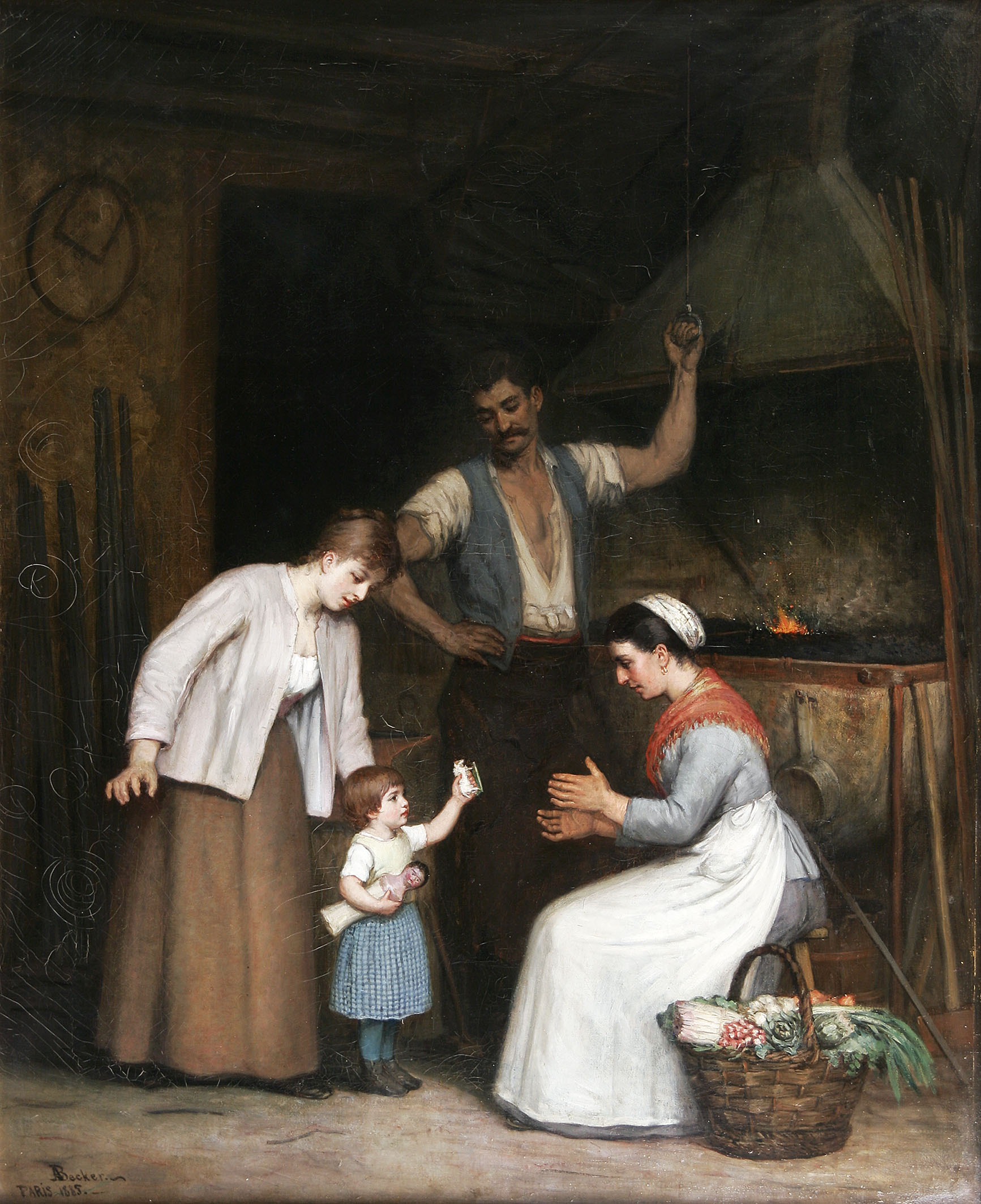
At the Smithy, 1885

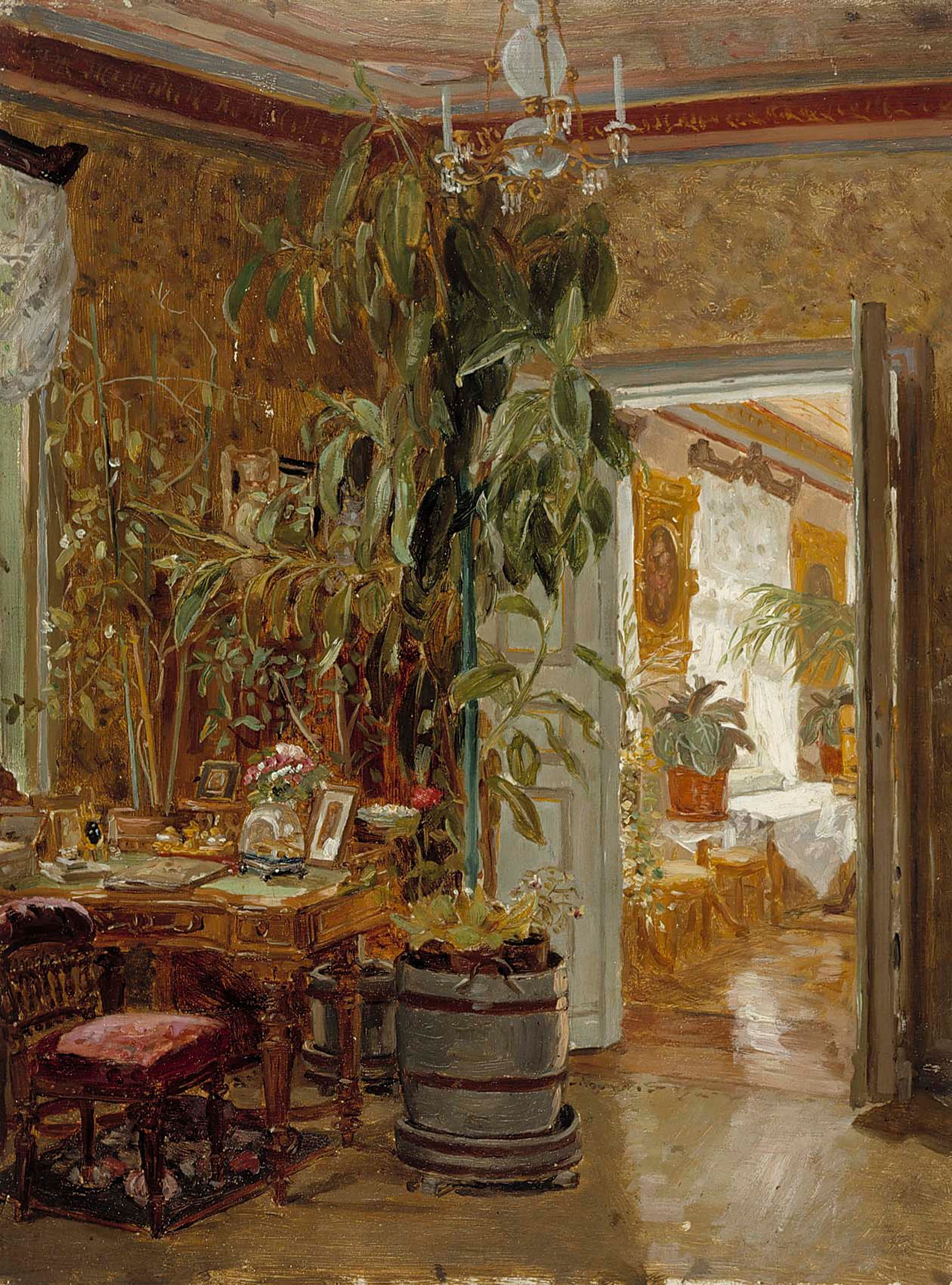
Interior from the Hallonblads' Home, Hympölä Manor, 1888

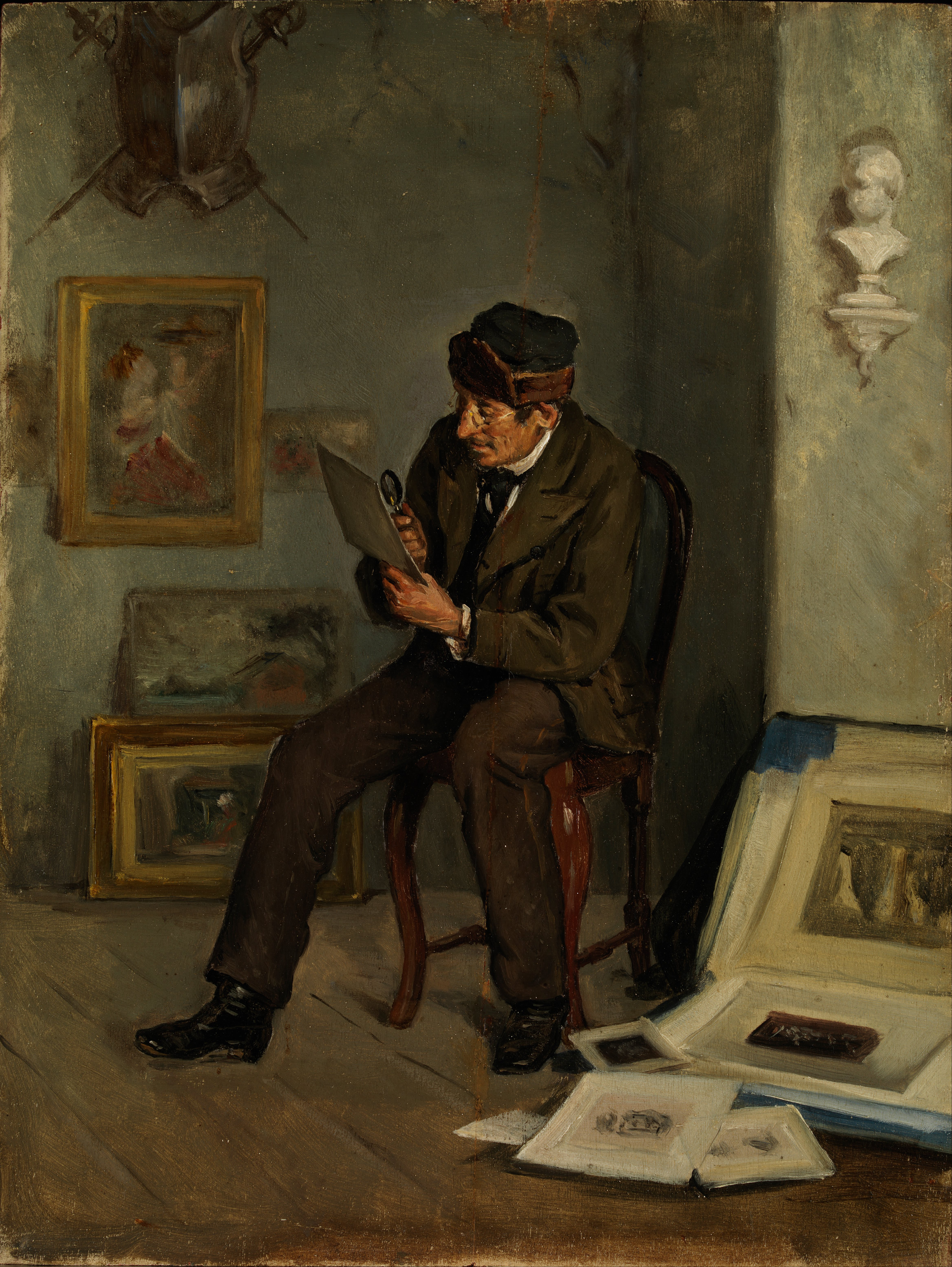
The Art Expert, late 19th century

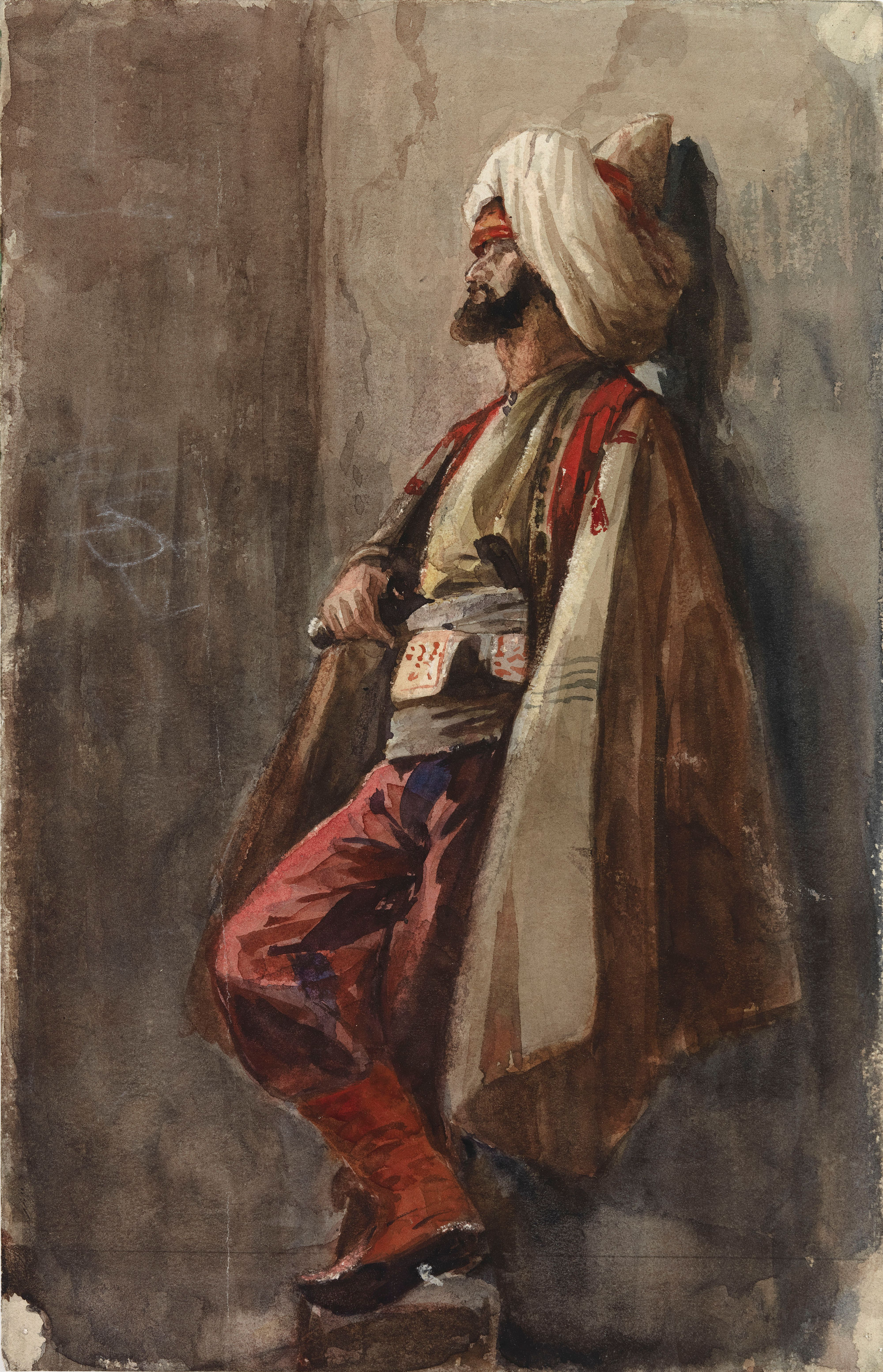
Man in an Oriental Outfit, unknown date

== See also ==
- Finnish art
