= Adelaïde Ehrnrooth =

Finnish feminist and writer

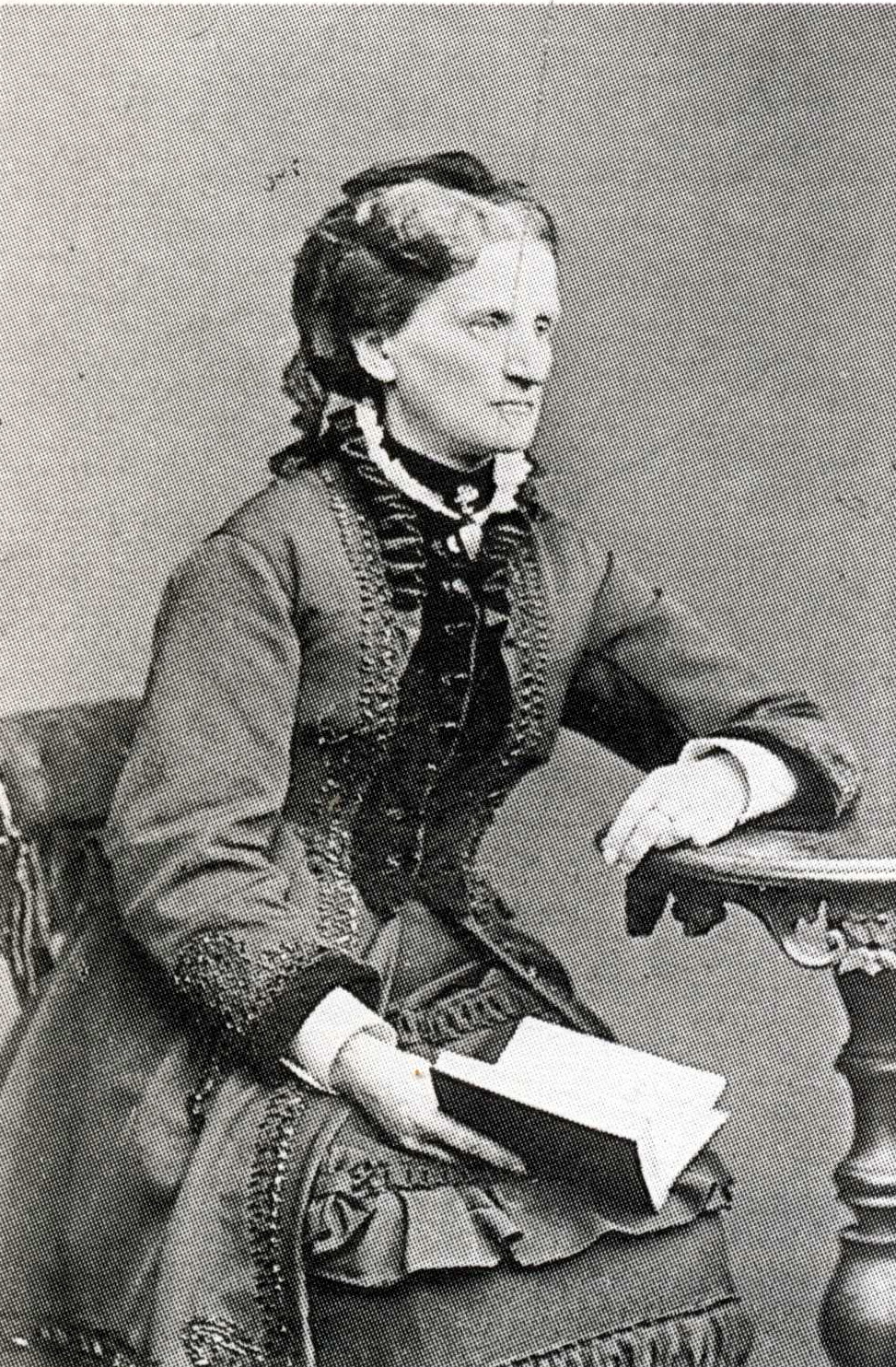
- Born: Lovisa Adelaïde Ehrnrooth; 17 January 1826
- Died: 31 May 1905 (aged 79)

Lovisa Adelaïde Ehrnrooth (17 January 1826 – 31 May 1905) was a Finnish feminist and writer. Adelaïde Ehrnrooth was born in Nastola, one of the 16 children of an aristocratic family. She was born to Gustaf Adolf Ehrnrooth, a hero of the Finnish War. John Casimir Ehrnrooth was her brother. Adelaïde Ehrnrooth never married, and dedicated her life to helping the women and the poor.

She was the founder of the Finnish Women's Association, the first society for women's suffrage in Finland. She was also active in the Naisasialiitto Unioni (The Finnish Women´s Association Unioni) in 1884 and the years after 1892 until her death in Helsinki. Helena Westermarck called her "Finland's first woman journalist".

Adelaïde Ehrnrooth proposed voting rights for women in 1869.

Aside from her activist life and writing poetry, Adelaïde Ehrnrooth wrote travel accounts of her frequent journeys.

== Legacy ==
Ehrnrooth's life was documented by biographer Helena Westermarck in Adelaïde Ehrnrooth.

== Bibliography ==
=== Poetry ===
- Sagor och minnen (1863)
- Gråsparven (1868)

=== Novels ===
- Bilder ur familjekretsarna i Finland (1866; Pictures from Life in Finland)
- Bland fattiga och rika (1887; Among Rich and Poor)
- Dagmar: En hvardaghistoria (1870; Dagmar: An everyday story)
- Tiden går och vi med den (1878; Time Passes and We With It)
- Hvardagslifvets skuggor och dagar (1881; Shadows and lights of everyday life)

=== Political ===
- I dagens intressanta samhällsfrågor, röst från en icke röstheråttigad (1882; On interesting social questions of the day: Vote for someone not entitled to vote)

=== Travel books ===
- Två finskors lustvandringar i Europa och Afrika åren 1876–77 och 1884 (1886; Two Finnish women's pleasure trips in Europe and Africe, 1876–77 and 1884)
- Resor i Orenten (1890; Travels in the Orient)
