= Rosina Heikel =

Finnish doctor (1842–1929)

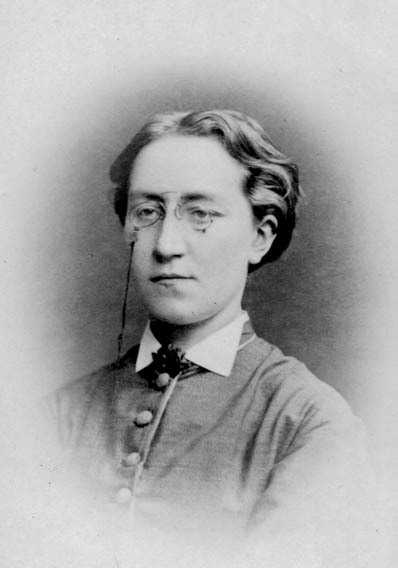
Rosina Heikel in 1875

Emma Rosina Heikel (17 March 1842 – 13 December 1929) was a Finnish medical doctor and feminist. In 1878, she became the first female physician in Finland and in Nordic countries, and specialised in gynaecology and paediatrics.

== Early life and education ==
Heikel was born in Kaskinen on 17 March 1842 to Carl Johan Heikel and Kristina Elisabet Dobbin. Her father was the mayor of Oulu and Kokkola, and both her brothers Alfred and Emil studied medicine. She attended school in Vaasa, Jakobstad, Porvoo and Helsinki, and was a good student.

From a young age she believed that access to education should be equal for all regardless of gender and had decided by 1862 to become a doctor like her brothers. There were no Finnish universities at the time, however, that would allow women to study medicine, and so she travelled to Sweden to train in physiotherapy at the Stockholm Gymnastics Institute. She finished the course in 1866 and returned to Helsinki, where she completed a course in midwifery a year later. She visited Stockholm again in 1869 to receive further tuition in anatomy and physiology.

In 1870, Heikel was allowed to attend physiology lectures at the University of Helsinki, and in 1871 she was given special permission to study medicine at the university. She received her medical degree in 1878, becoming the first woman physician in Finland, as well as the first in the Nordic countries.

== Career ==
=== Medicine ===
Heikel was granted a limited license to practice, which allowed her to treat only women and children. During 1878, she practiced in Stockholm and Copenhagen, and moved to Vaasa in 1879 to specialise in women's and children's health. She could not register as a member of the Finnish Medical Society until 1884. In 1883 the post of city gynaecologist in Helsinki was created for her; it was changed to city gynaecologist and paediatrician in 1889. Heikel stayed in the role until 1901 and maintained a private Helsinki practice until 1906.

=== Activism ===
Outside of medical practice, Heikel was an active proponent of the women's rights movement and the feminist association Naisasialiitto Unioni. An advocate of women's education, she helped to found Konkordia-liitto, an organisation for female academics. In 1888, Heikel spoke at a meeting of the Finnish Medical Society against legalised prostitution, and in 1892 she addressed the Naisasialiitto Unioni to promote equality in educational opportunities for girls and boys. She managed a children's workhouse and was an advocate for children's health in rural Finland.

== Death ==
Heikel died on 13 December 1929 in Helsinki, with no surviving family. She is buried in the Hietaniemi Cemetery in Helsinki.
