= Helene Schjerfbeck =

Finnish painter (1862–1946)

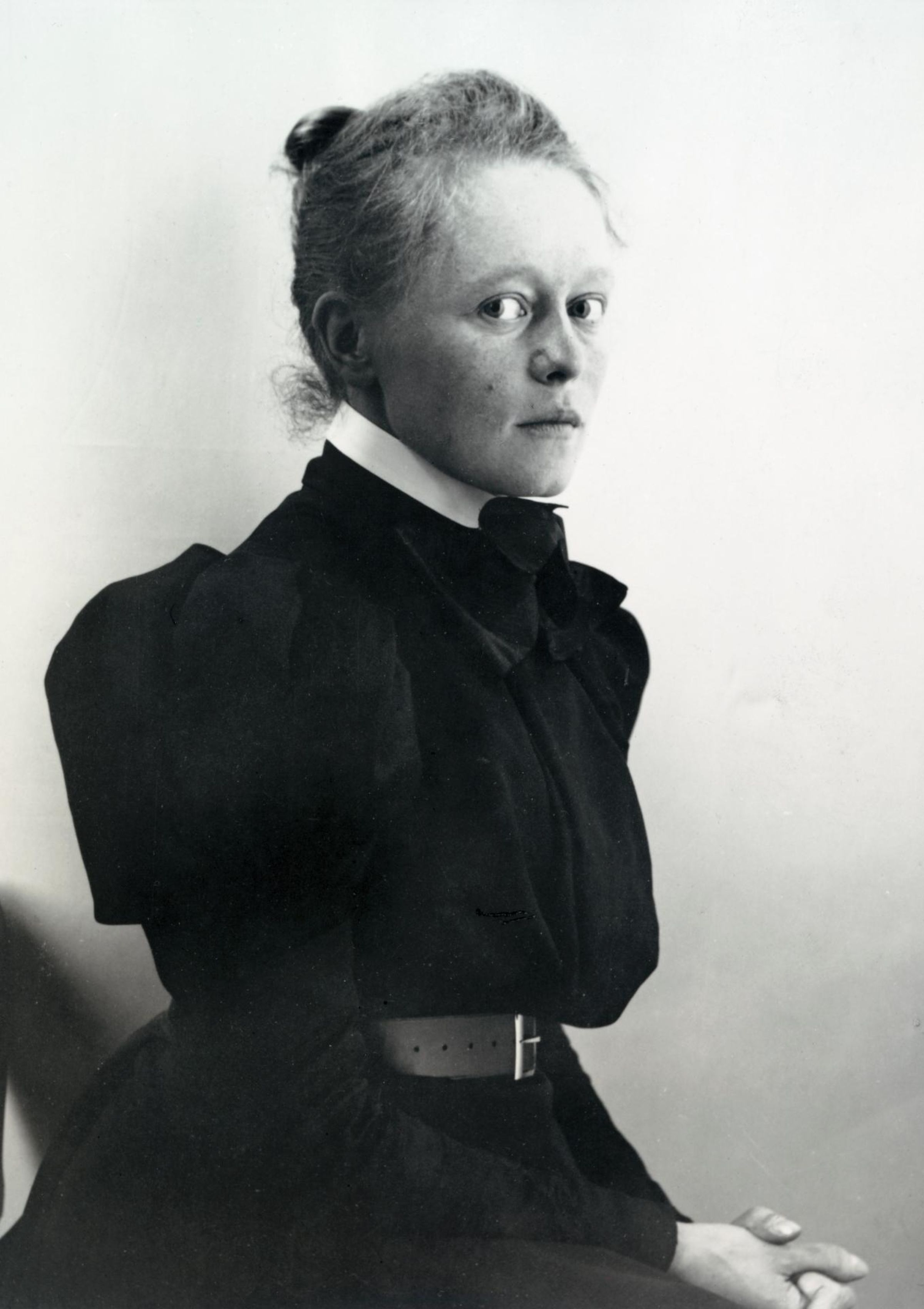
- Early 1890s.
- Born: Helena Sofia Schjerfbeck; July 10, 1862; Helsinki, Grand Duchy of Finland
- Died: January 23, 1946 (aged 83); Saltsjöbaden, Sweden
- Education: Finnish Art Society School of Drawing; Académie Colarossi, Paris
- Known for: Painting
- Movement: Naturalism (arts), Realism and Expressionism
- Awards: Order of the White Rose of Finland

Helena Sofia (Helene) Schjerfbeck (pronounced [heˈleːn ˈʃæ̌rvbek]; July 10, 1862 – January 23, 1946) was a Finnish modernist painter known for her realist works and self-portraits, and also for her landscapes and still lifes. Throughout her long life her work changed dramatically, beginning with French-influenced realism and plein air painting. It gradually evolved towards portraits and still life paintings. At the beginning of her career she often produced historical paintings, such as the Wounded Warrior in the Snow (1880), At the Door of Linköping Jail in 1600 (1882) and The Death of Wilhelm von Schwerin (1886). Historical paintings were usually the realm of male painters, as was experimentation with modern influences and French radical naturalism, and her works from mostly the 1880s did not receive a favourable reception until later in her life.

Her work starts with a dazzlingly skilled, somewhat melancholic version of late-19th-century academic realism.... It ends with distilled, nearly abstract images in which pure paint and cryptic description are held in perfect balance. (Roberta Smith, The New York Times, November 27, 1992)

Schjerfbeck's birthday, July 10, is Finland's national day for the painted arts.

== Early life ==
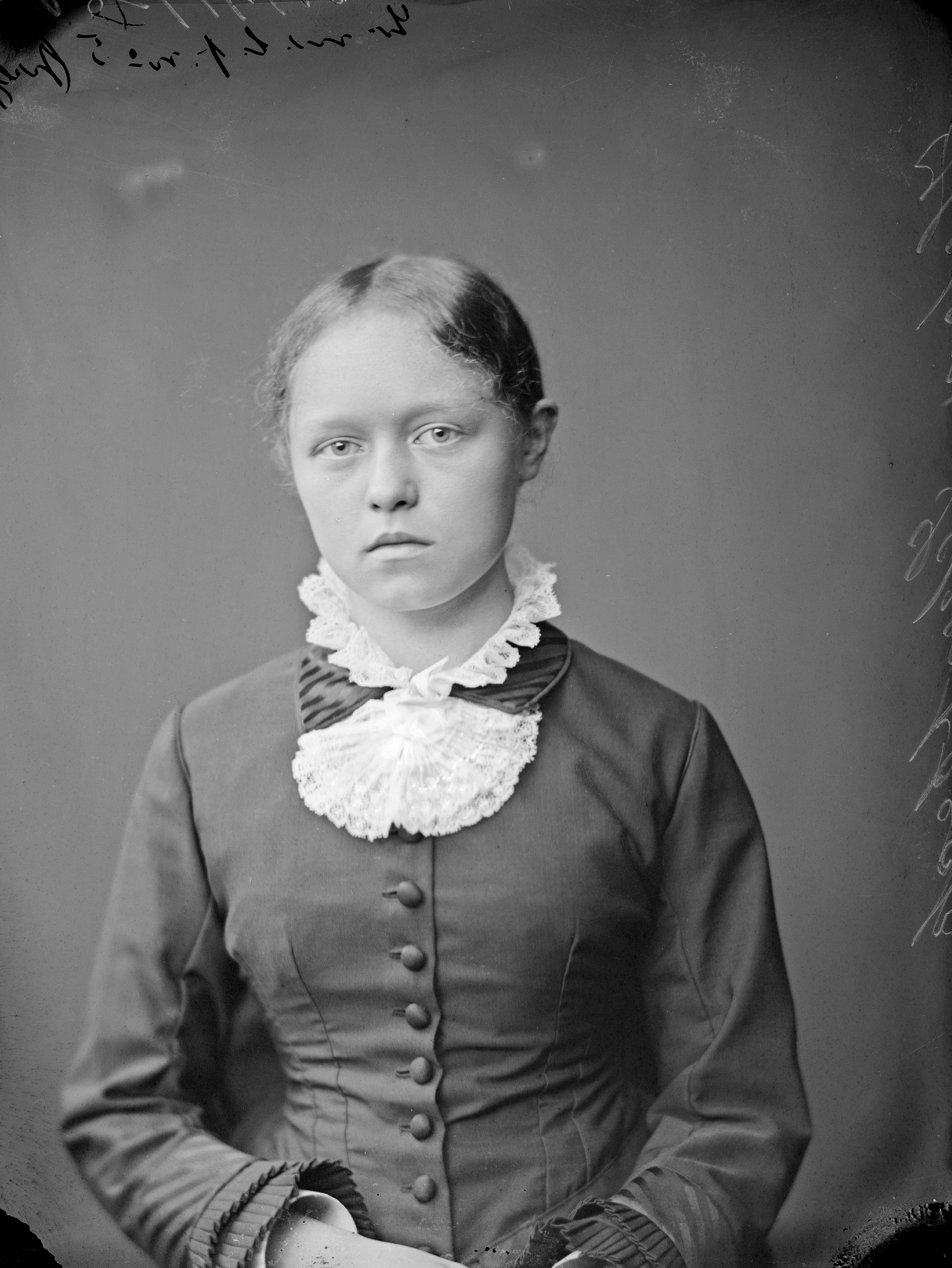
Young Schjerfbeck in 1880

Helena Sofia Schjerfbeck was born on July 10, 1862, in Helsinki, in the autonomous Grand-Duchy of Finland within the Russian Empire, to Svante Schjerfbeck (an office manager at the railway's mechanical workshop) and Olga Johanna (née Printz). She had one surviving brother, Magnus Schjerfbeck (1860–1933), who went on to become an architect. Her mother Olga did not value her daughter's work as an artist, yet decades of living together bound them inseparably. In 1866, aged 4, she fell down some stairs injuring her hip, which prevented her from attending school and left her with a limp for the rest of her life. She showed talent at an early age, and at eleven years old in 1873 she was enrolled at the Finnish Art Society School of Drawing. Her fees were paid by Adolf von Becker, who saw promise in her. At this school Schjerfbeck met Helena Westermarck. These two, artist Maria Wiik, and the lesser-known Ada Thilén had a close friendship during their lives.

When Schjerfbeck's father died of tuberculosis, on February 2, 1876, Schjerfbeck's mother took in boarders so that they could get by. A little over a year after her father's death, Schjerfbeck graduated from the Finnish Art Society drawing school. She continued her education, with Westermarck and paid for by Professor Georg Asp, at a private academy run by Adolf von Becker, which utilised the University of Helsinki drawing studio. There, Becker himself taught her French oil painting techniques.

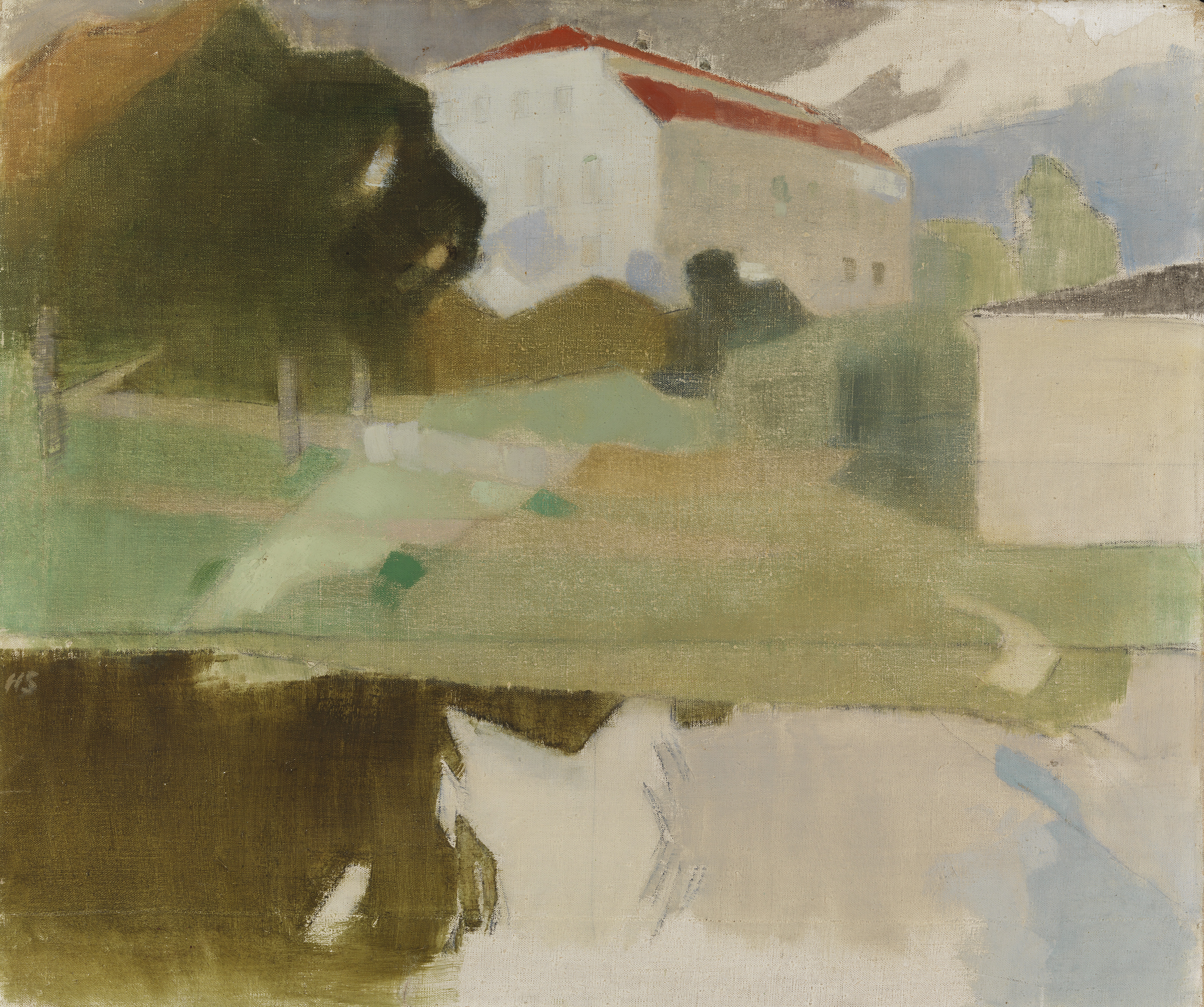
Sjundby Manor in Siuntio in Schjerfbeck's painting from 1927.

In 1879, at the age of 17, Schjerfbeck won third prize in a competition organised by the Finnish Art Society, and in 1880 her work was displayed in an annual Finnish Art Society exhibition. That summer Schjerfbeck spent time at Sjundby Manor in Siuntio, owned by her aunt on her mother's side Selma Printz and her husband Thomas Adlercreutz. There she spent time drawing and painting her cousins. Schjerfbeck's earliest sketchbooks feature many drawings depicting life in Sjundby. The manor house and its gardens are featured in various landscapes of hers such as The Old Manor House (1901) and Sjundby Manor (1927). Schjerfbeck became particularly close to her cousin Selma Adlercreutz, who was her age. Later in 1880 she set off to Paris after receiving a travel grant from the Imperial Russian Senate.

== Career ==
=== Paris ===
In Paris, Schjerfbeck painted with Helena Westermarck, then left to study with Léon Bonnat and Gustave Courtois at Mme Trélat de Vigny's studio; she later regarded Courtois as her most important teacher. In 1881 she moved to the Académie Colarossi, where she studied once again with Westermarck. The Imperial Senate gave her another scholarship, which she used to spend a couple of months in Meudon, and then a few more months in Pont-Aven, a small fishing village near Concarneau, Brittany. She then went back to the Académie Colarossi briefly, before returning to the Adlercreutz family manor in Finland. Schjerfbeck continued to move around frequently, painting and studying with various people. Schjerfbeck made money by continuing to put her paintings in the Art Society's exhibitions, and she also did illustrations for books. After returning to Finland in 1882, in 1884 she was back in Paris at the Académie Colarossi with Westermarck, but this time they were working there. During this time she participated in Académie des Beaux-Arts' The Salon and painted again in Brittany. In the chapel of Trèmolo near the village of Pont-Aven Schjerfbeck produced the painting The Door (1884).

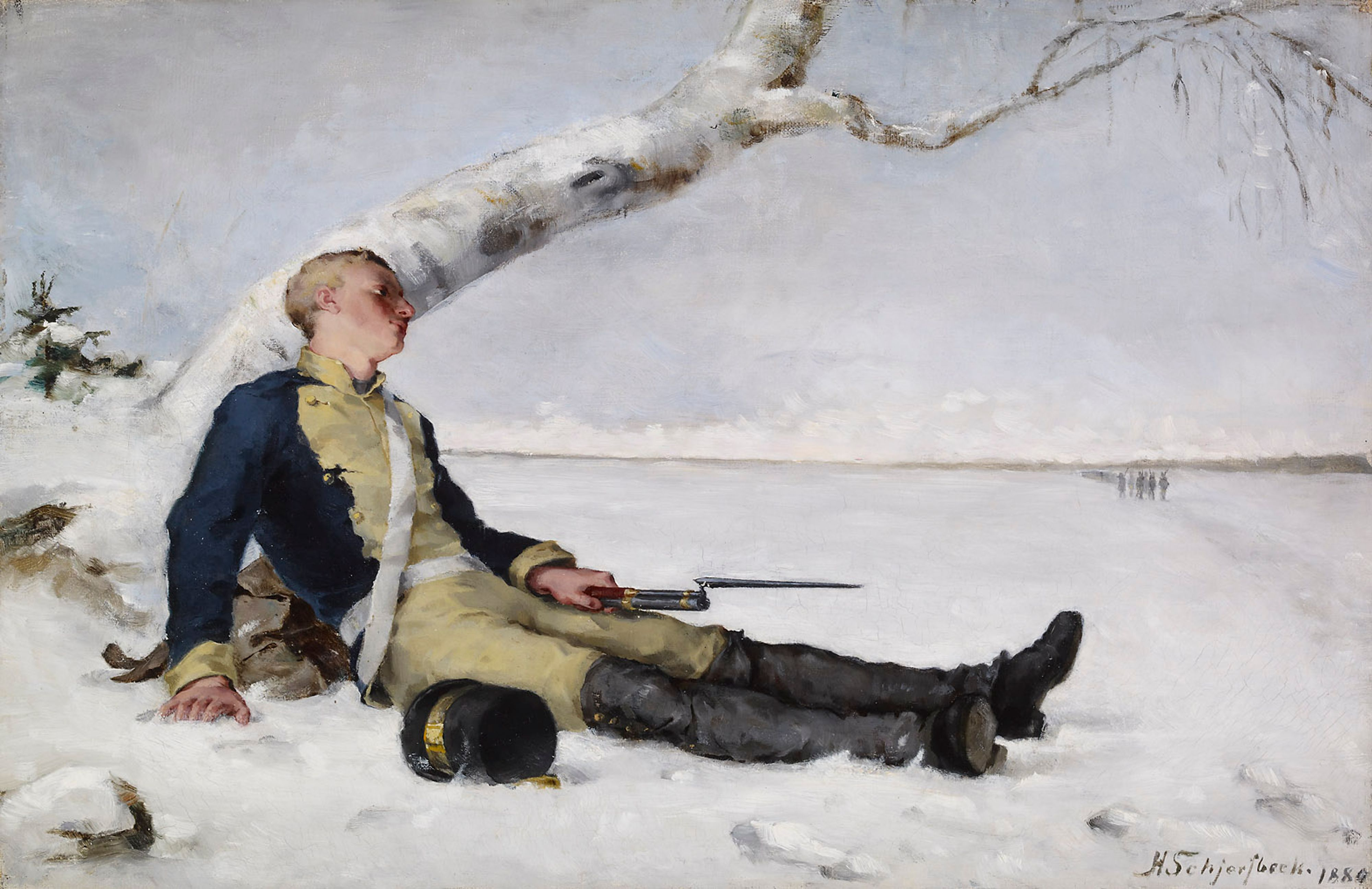
Wounded Warrior in the Snow, 1880 (fi)

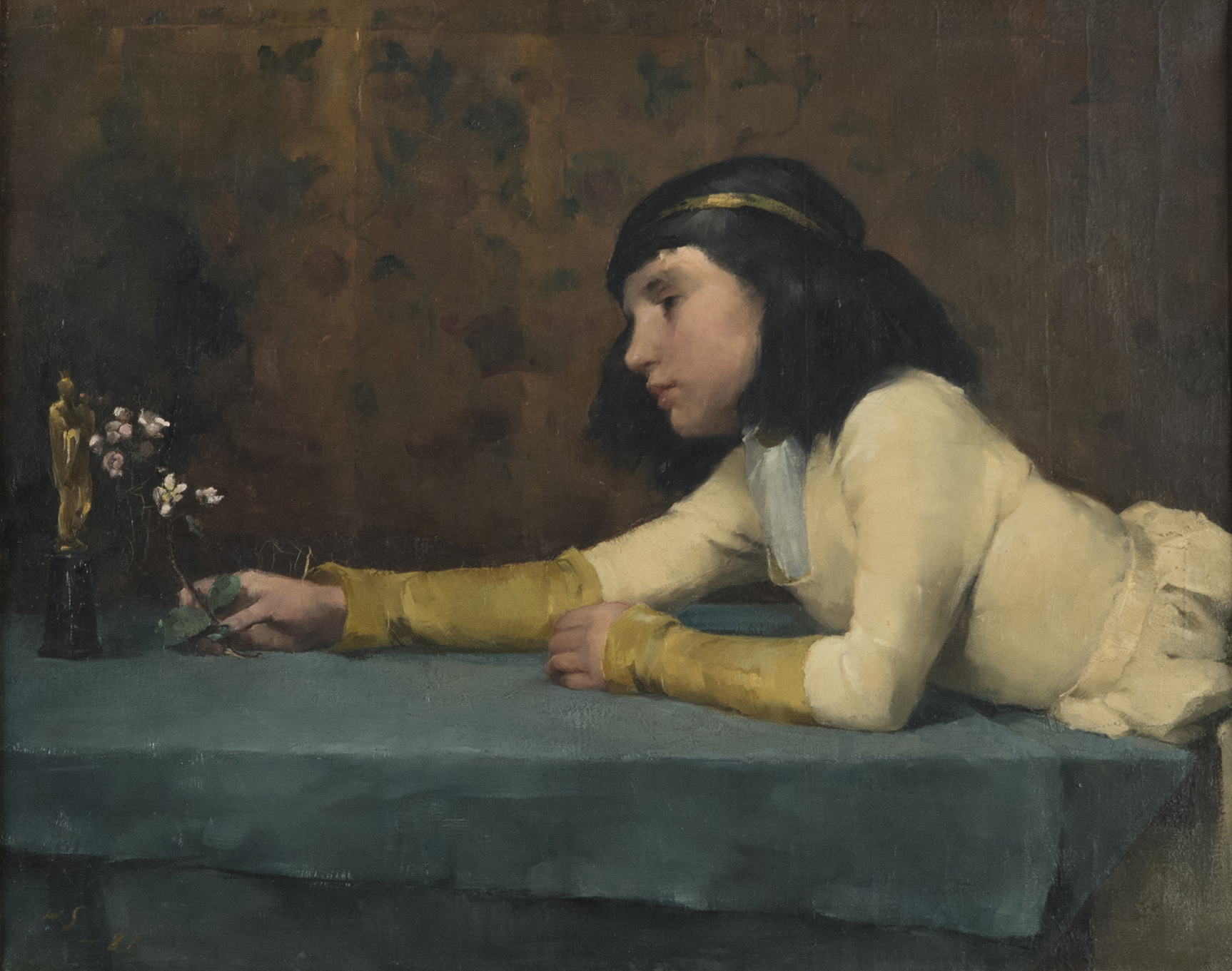
Girl with a Madonna, 1881

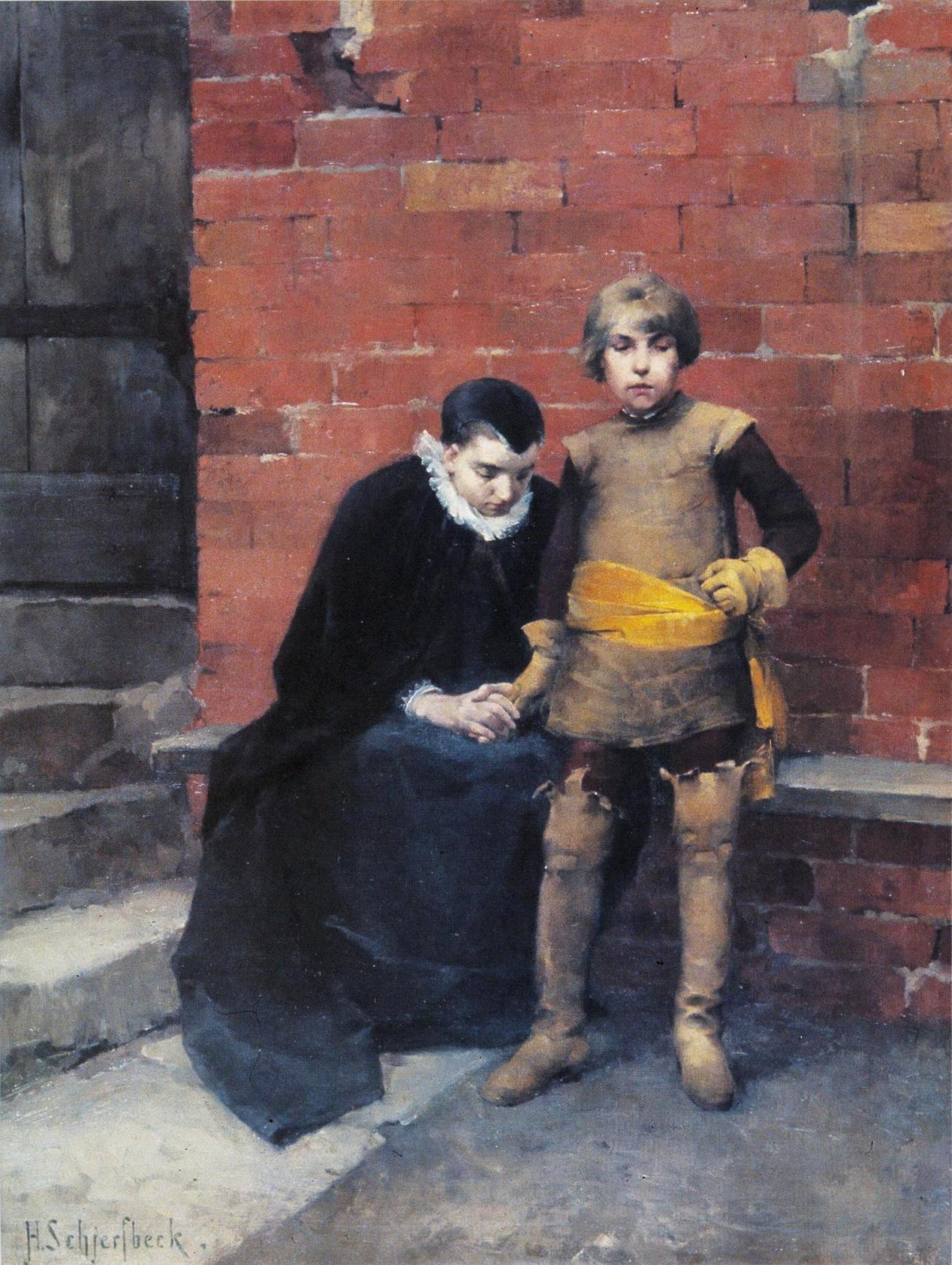
At the Door of Linköping Jail in 1600, 1882 (fi)

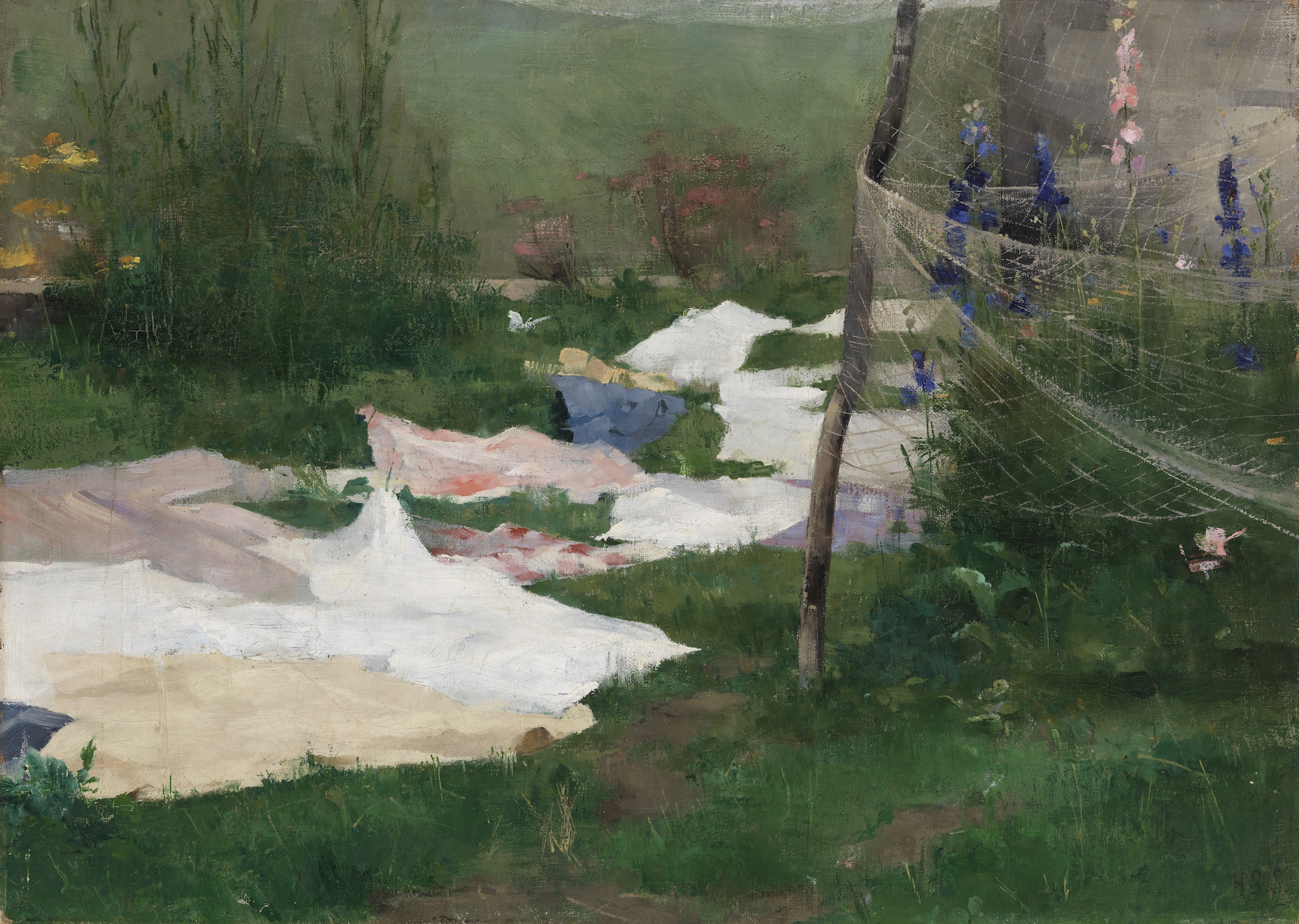
Clothes Drying, 1883

=== Engagement and travels ===
In late Autumn 1883, Schjerfbeck got engaged to a Swedish painter Otto Hagborg who also lived in Pont-Aven in the winter and spring of 1883–1884. The engagement, however, came to an end in 1885 when a problem with Schjerfbeck's hip led the groom's family to suspect tuberculosis. In reality the problem resulted from a fall during her childhood. Schjerfbeck never married; she appears to have particularly mourned the fact that she was childless, and at one point considered adoption, but abandoned the idea in the face of incomprehension from those around her.

After spending a year in Finland, Schjerfbeck travelled again to Paris in the autumn of 1886. Schjerfbeck was given more money to travel by a man from the Finnish Art Society and in 1887 she travelled to St Ives, Cornwall, in Britain. There she painted The Bakery (1887) and The Convalescent, the latter winning the bronze medal at the 1889 Paris World Fair. The Convalescent has remained one of her most prominent paintings; the New York Times described it as "reportedly the single most famous painting in Finland." The painting was later bought by the Finnish Art Society. During this period Schjerfbeck was painting in a naturalistic plein-air style.

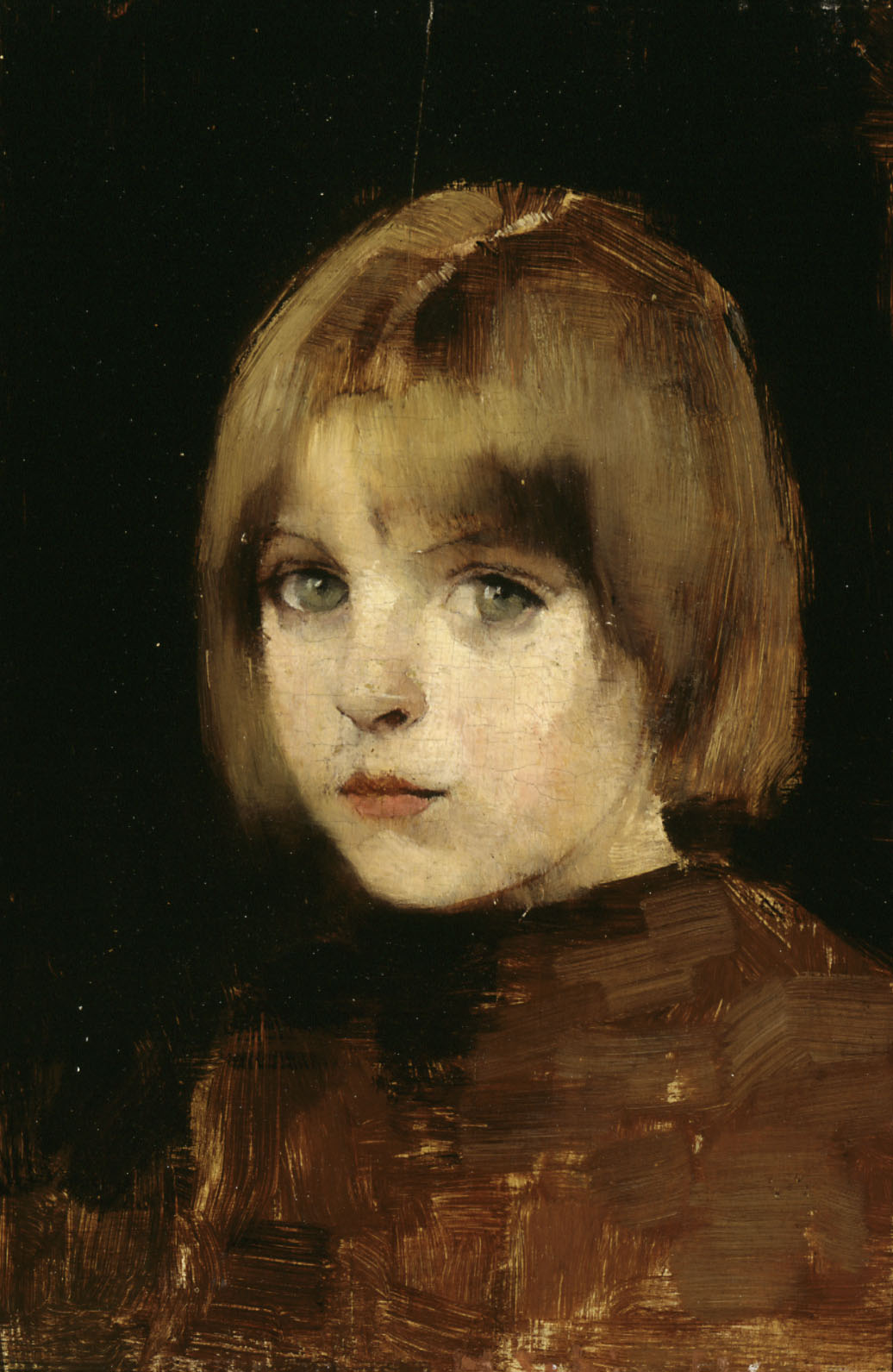
Portrait of a Girl, 1885

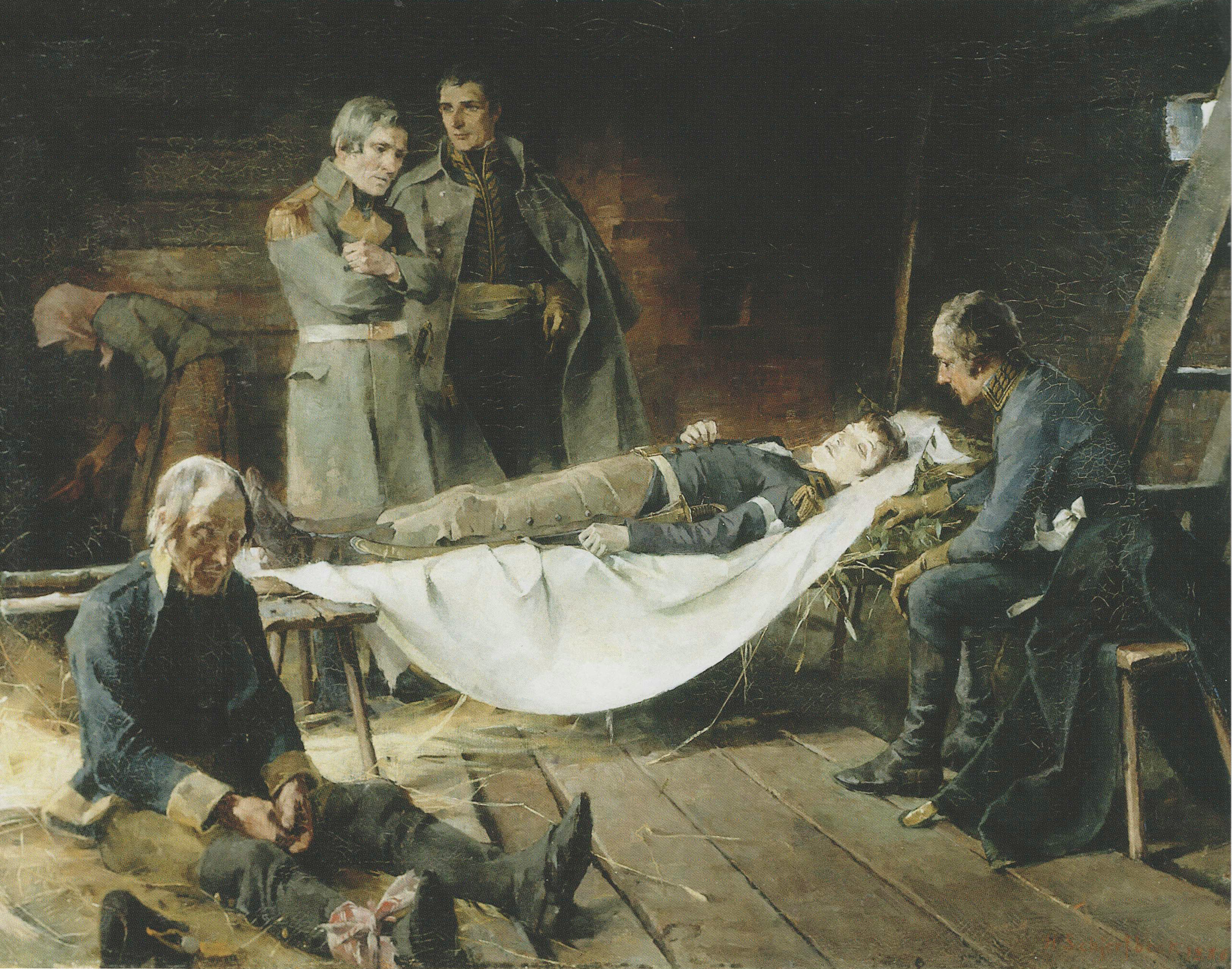
The Death of Wilhelm von Schwerin, 1886

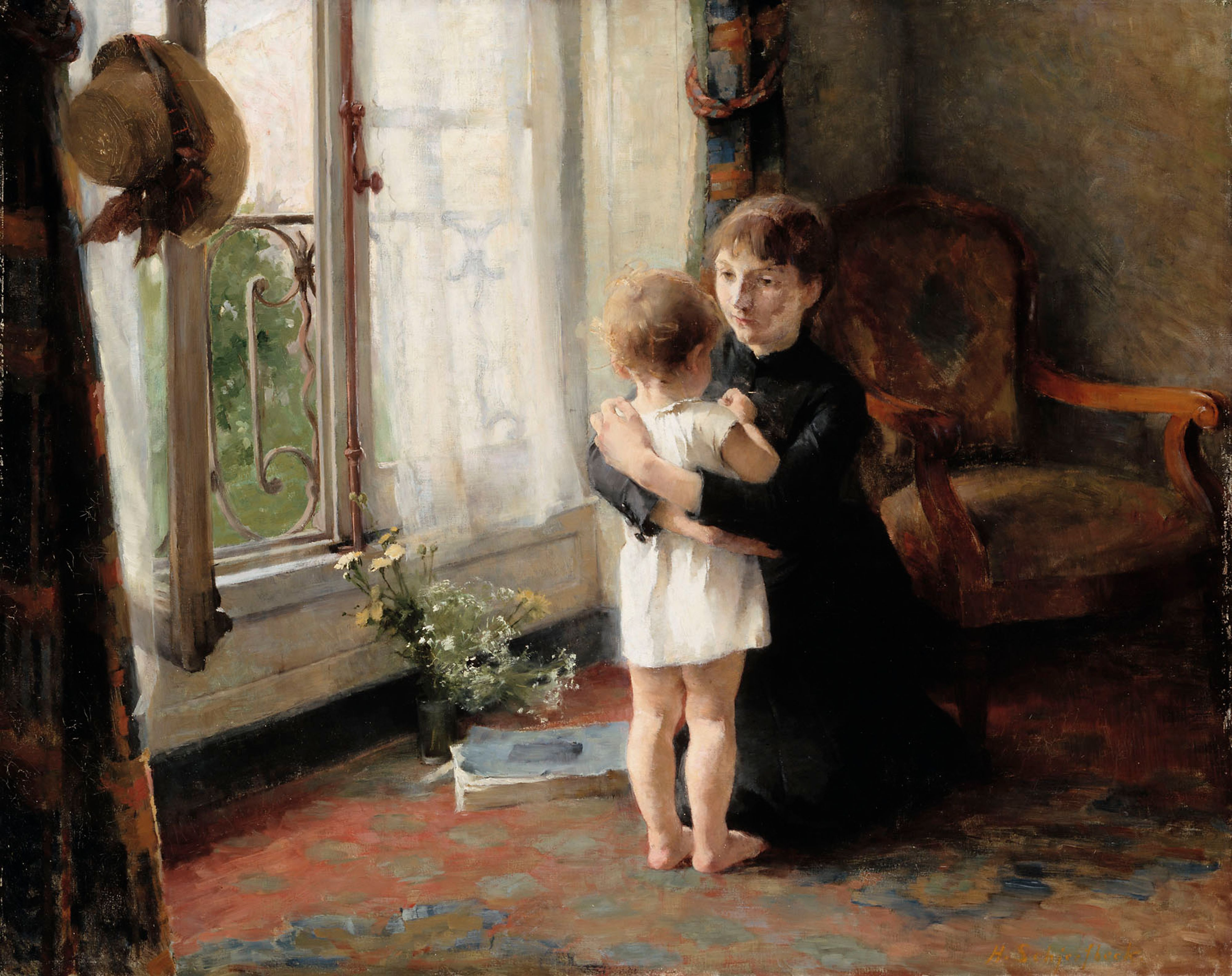
Mother and Child, 1886

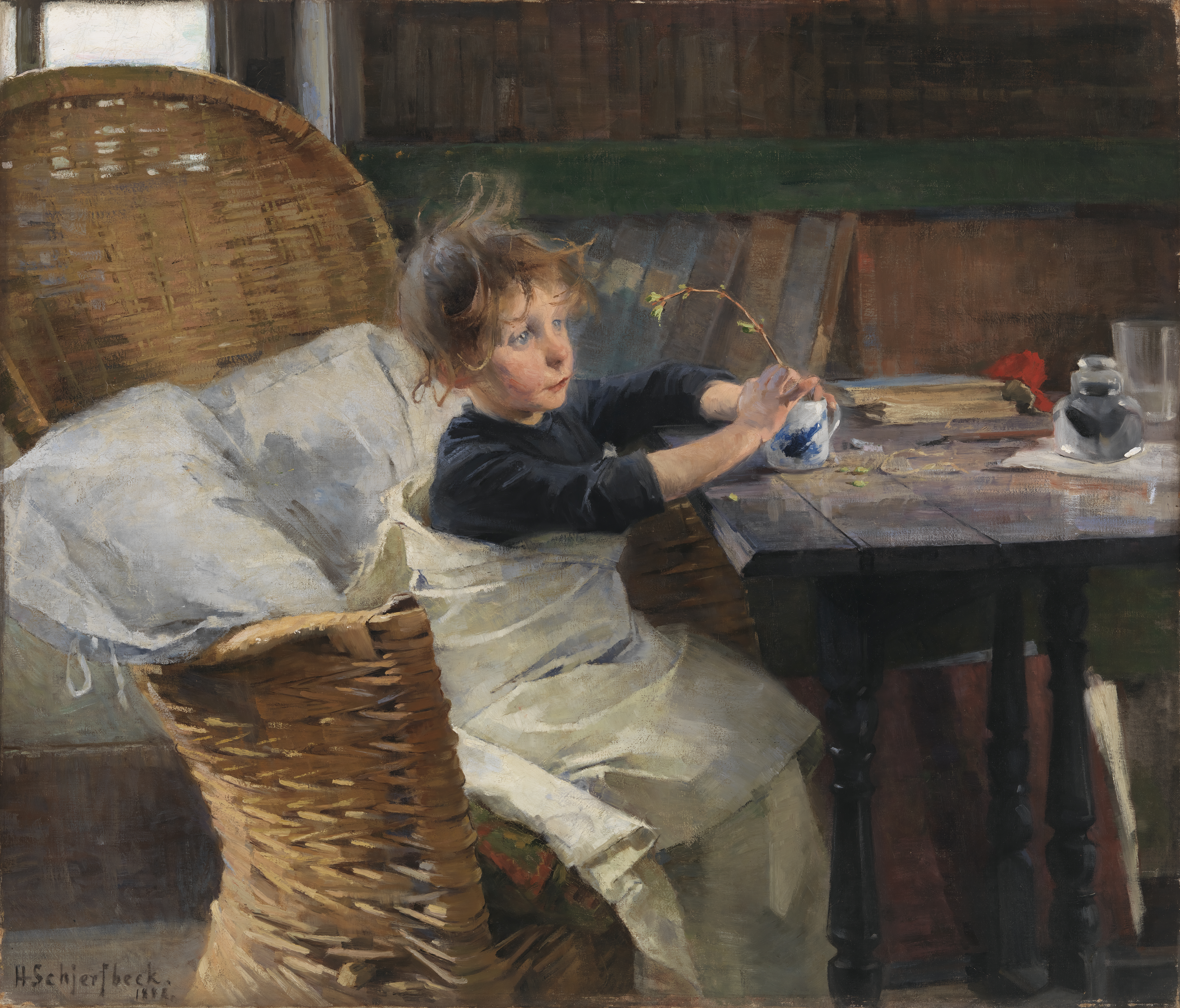
The Convalescent, 1888
(it was voted second in a 2006 public vote organized by Ateneum for Finland's "national painting")

=== Hyvinkää years ===
In the 1890s Schjerfbeck started teaching regularly in Finland at the Art Society drawing school, now the Academy of Fine Arts. Hilda Flodin was one of her students. However, in 1901 she became too ill to teach and in 1902 she resigned from her post. On her doctor's advice she moved with her mother to Hyvinkää, whose dry climate was considered healthy, and where she would remain for the next two decades. While living in Hyvinkää, she continued to paint and exhibit. Cut off from the Helsinki art world, her main contact with contemporary art came through magazines and books sent by friends. Schjerfbeck also took up hobbies such as reading and embroidery.

During this time Schjerfbeck produced still lifes and landscape paintings, as well as portraits, such as that of her mother, local school girls and women workers, and also self-portraits, and she became a modernist painter. Her work has been compared to that of artists such as James McNeill Whistler and Edvard Munch, but from 1905 her paintings took on a character that was hers alone. She continued experimenting with various techniques such as using different types of underpainting.

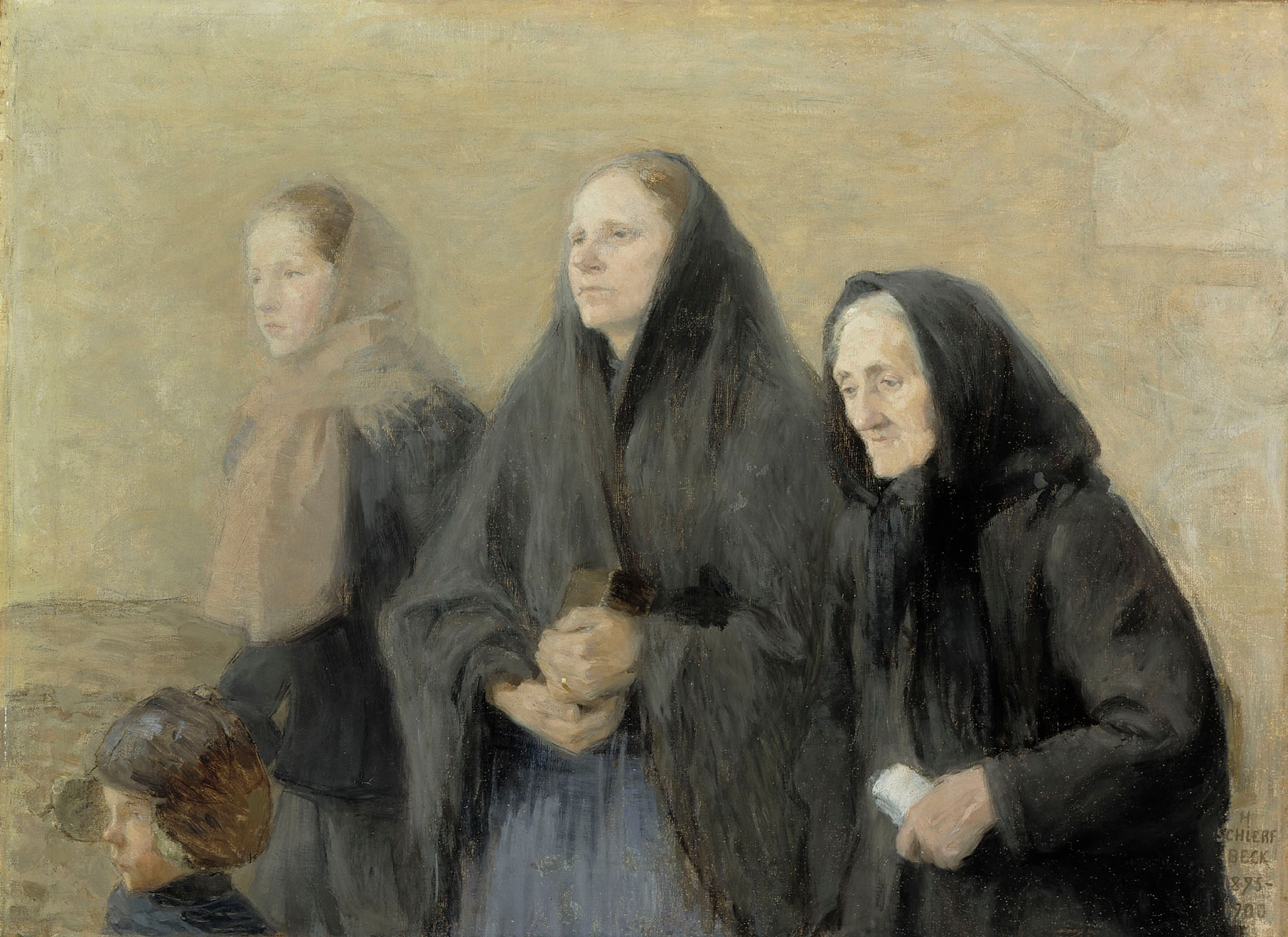
Churchgoers (Easter Morning), 1900 (fi)

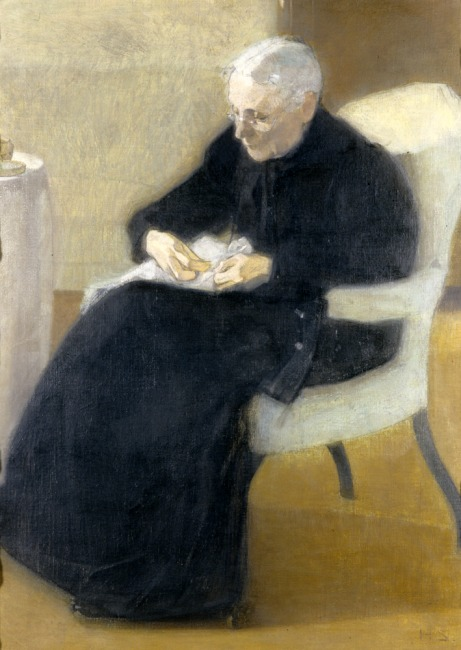
At Home, 1903
(depicts Olga Schjerfbeck, the artist's mother)

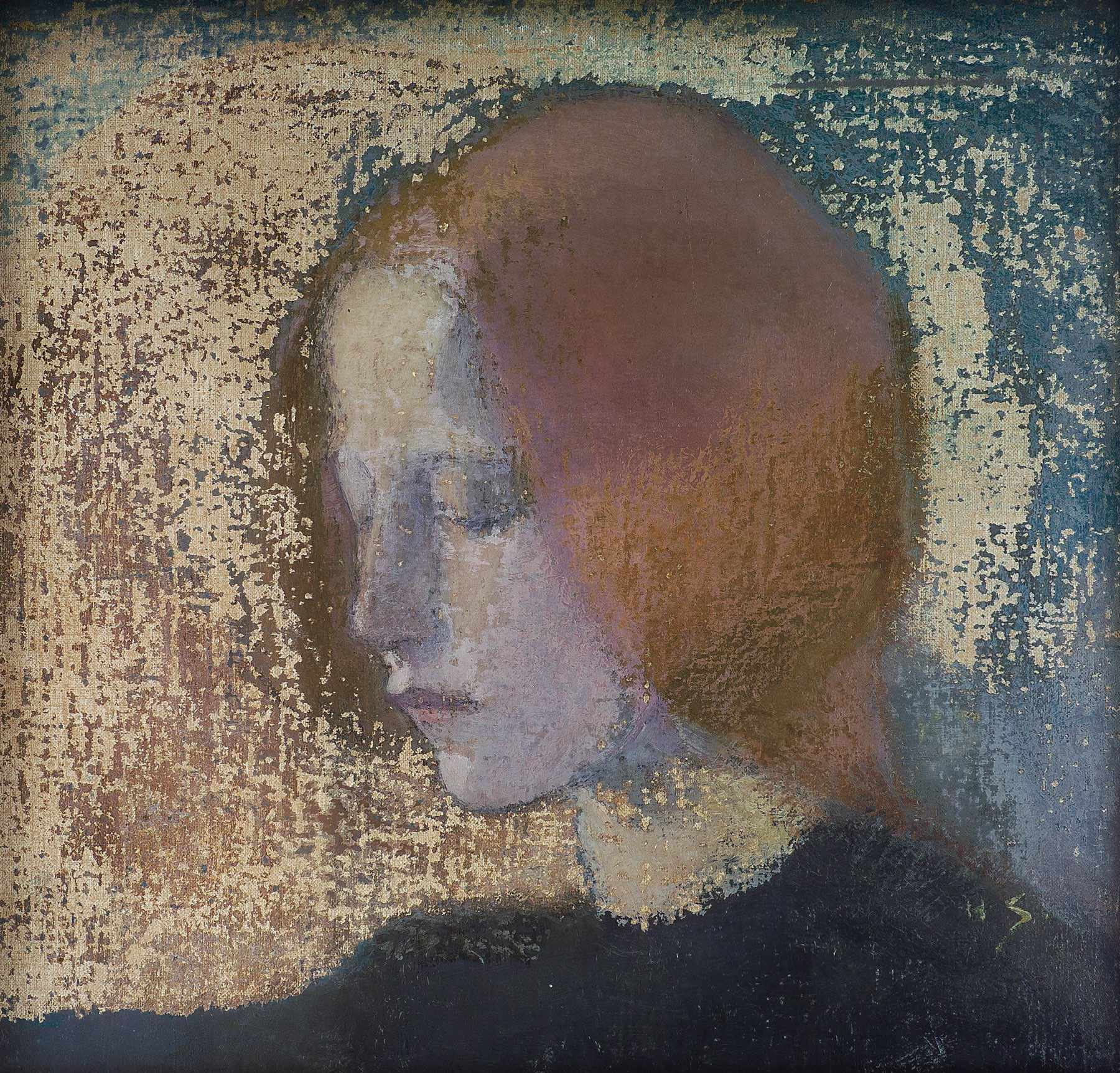
Fragment, c. 1904
(the worn look is deliberate)

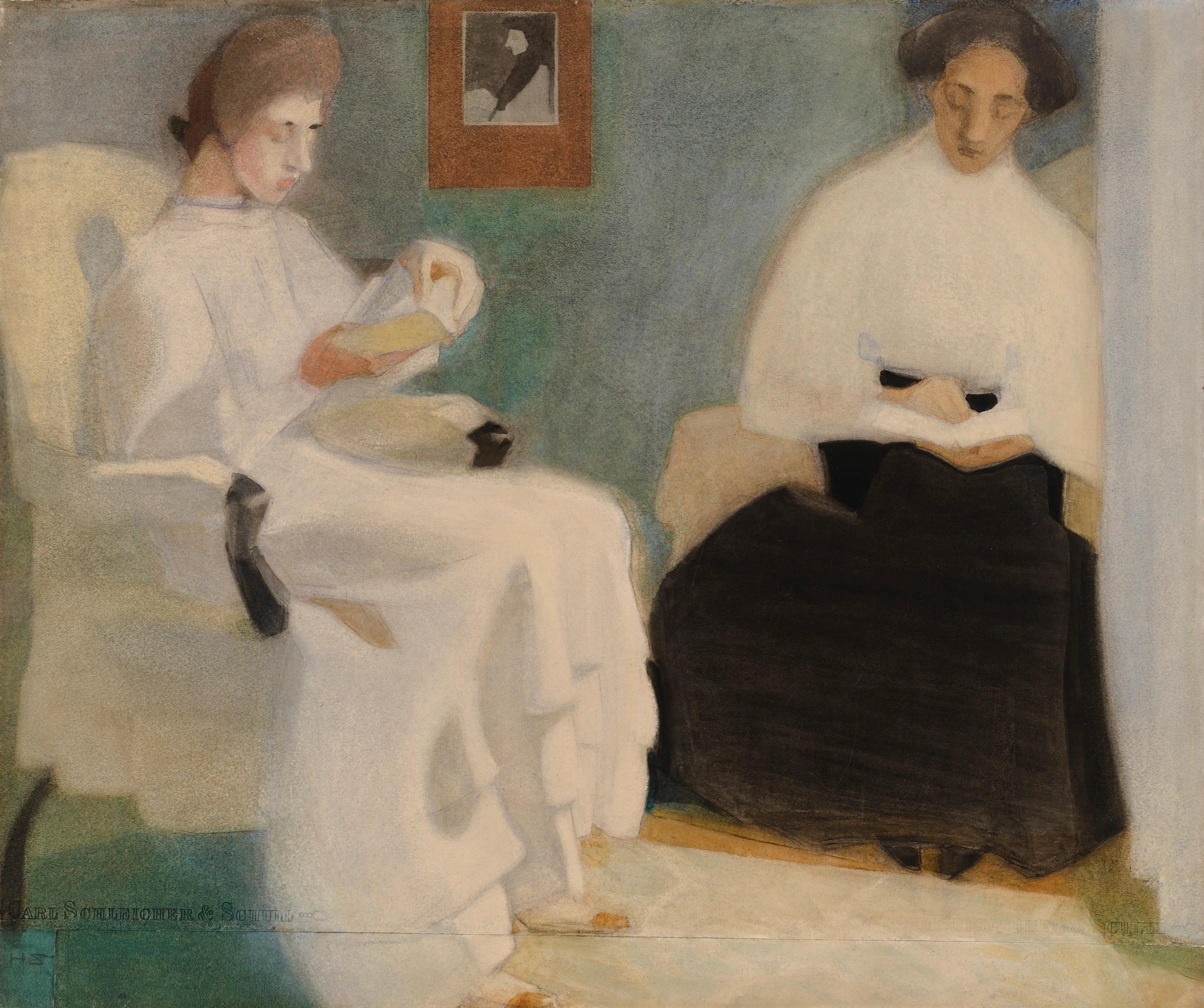
Girls Reading, 1907

=== Exhibitions ===
In 1913 Schjerfbeck was sought out by the art dealer Gösta Stenman, who became convinced of her work's quality and set about making her better known. Through his encouragement she exhibited at Malmö in 1914, Stockholm in 1916 and St Petersburg in 1917. In 1917 Stenman organised her first solo exhibition. That same year, Einar Reuter — a forest officer and art enthusiast who had befriended Schjerfbeck in Hyvinkää — published the first monograph on her work under the pseudonym H. Ahtela. Later she exhibited at Copenhagen (1919), Gothenburg (1923) and Stockholm (1934). In 1937 Stenman organised another solo exhibition for her in Stockholm, and in 1938 he began paying her a monthly stipend. Her paintings were successfully displayed in several exhibitions in Sweden in the 1930s and 1940s. A large retrospective planned for the United States in 1939 had to be cancelled owing to the outbreak of war. In 1942, on the occasion of Schjerfbeck's 80th birthday, Stenman organised a major tribute exhibition in Stockholm.

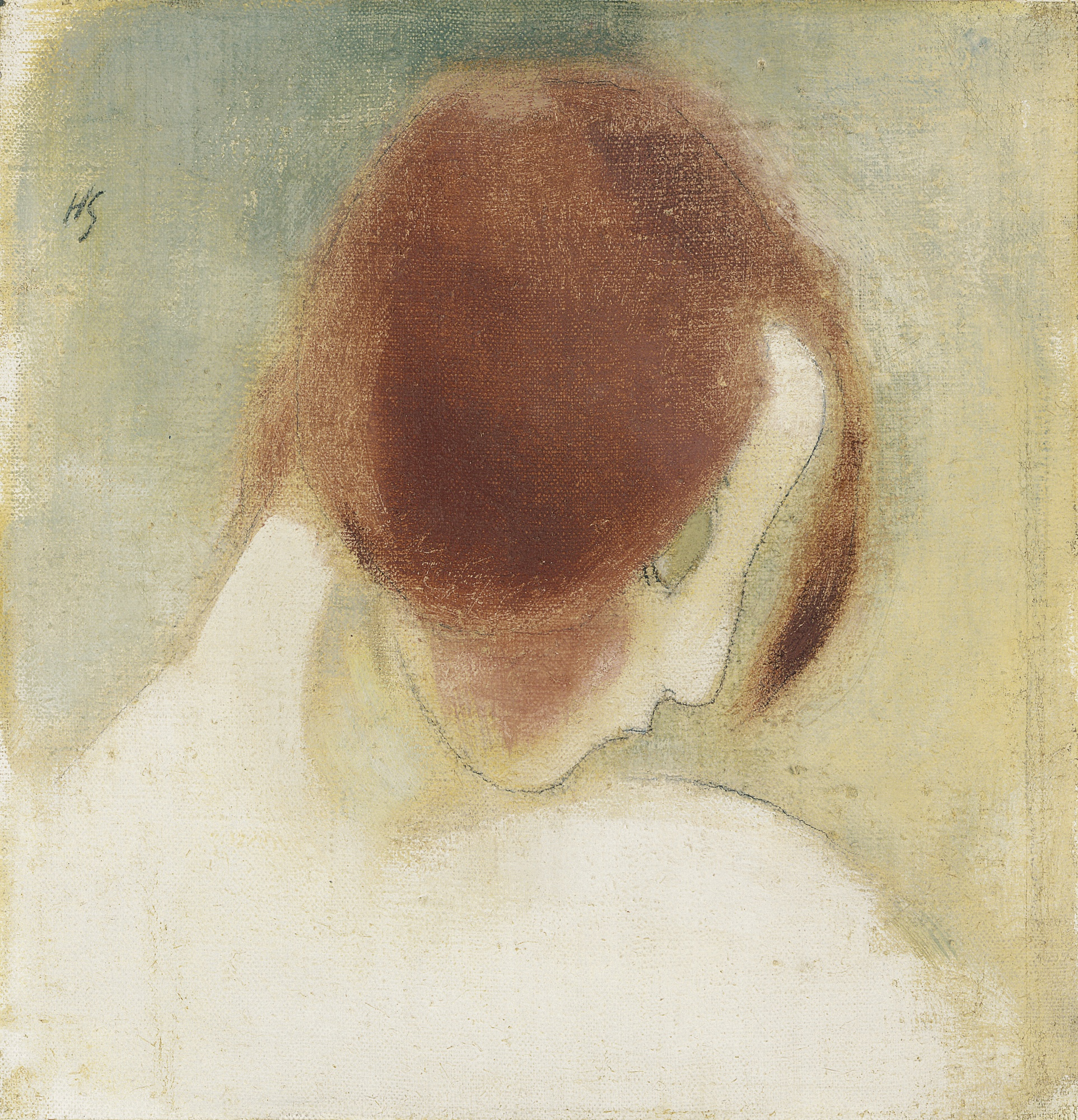
The Red-Haired Girl II, 1915

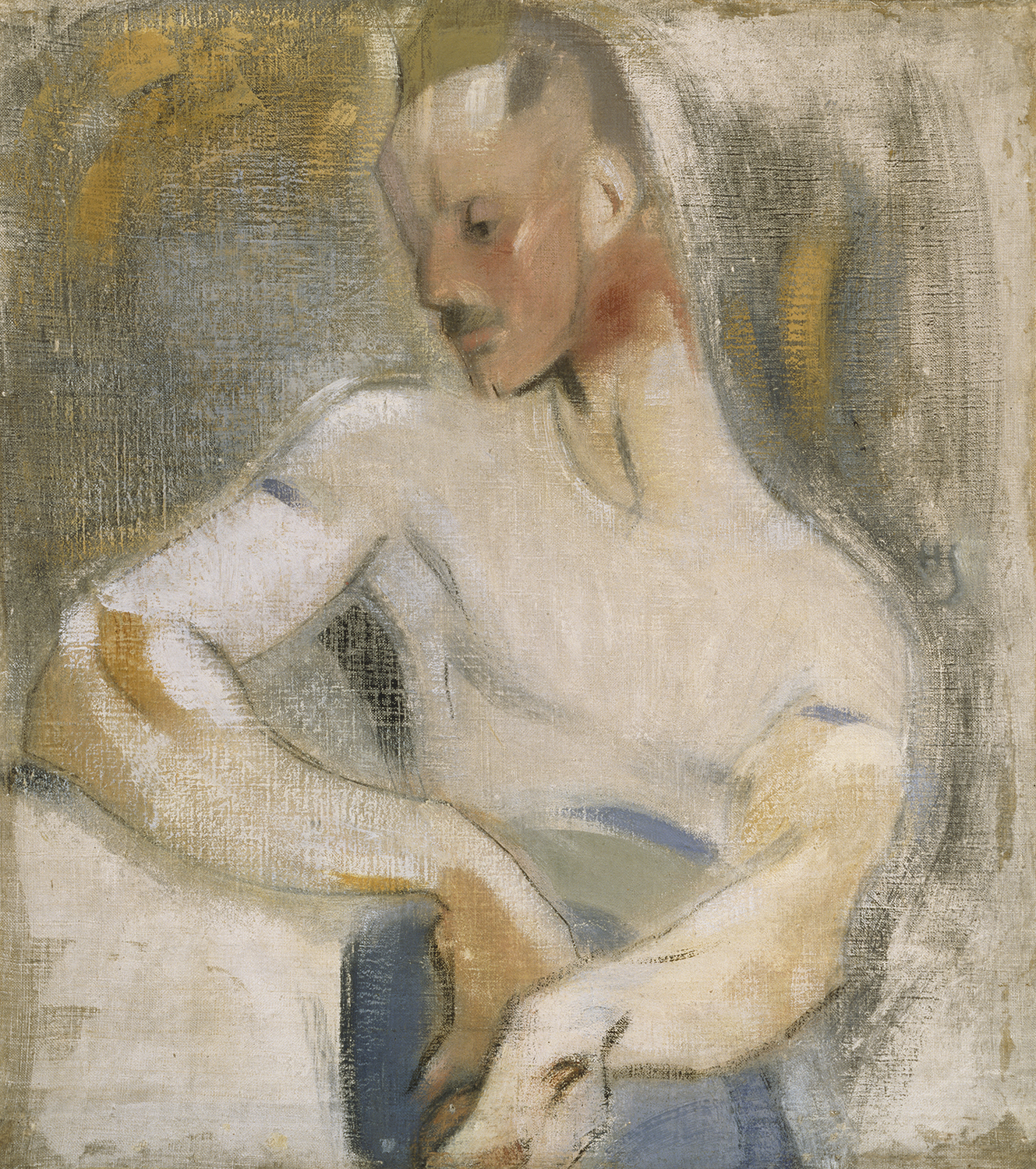
The Sailor, 1918
(depicts Helene's close friend Einar Reuter)

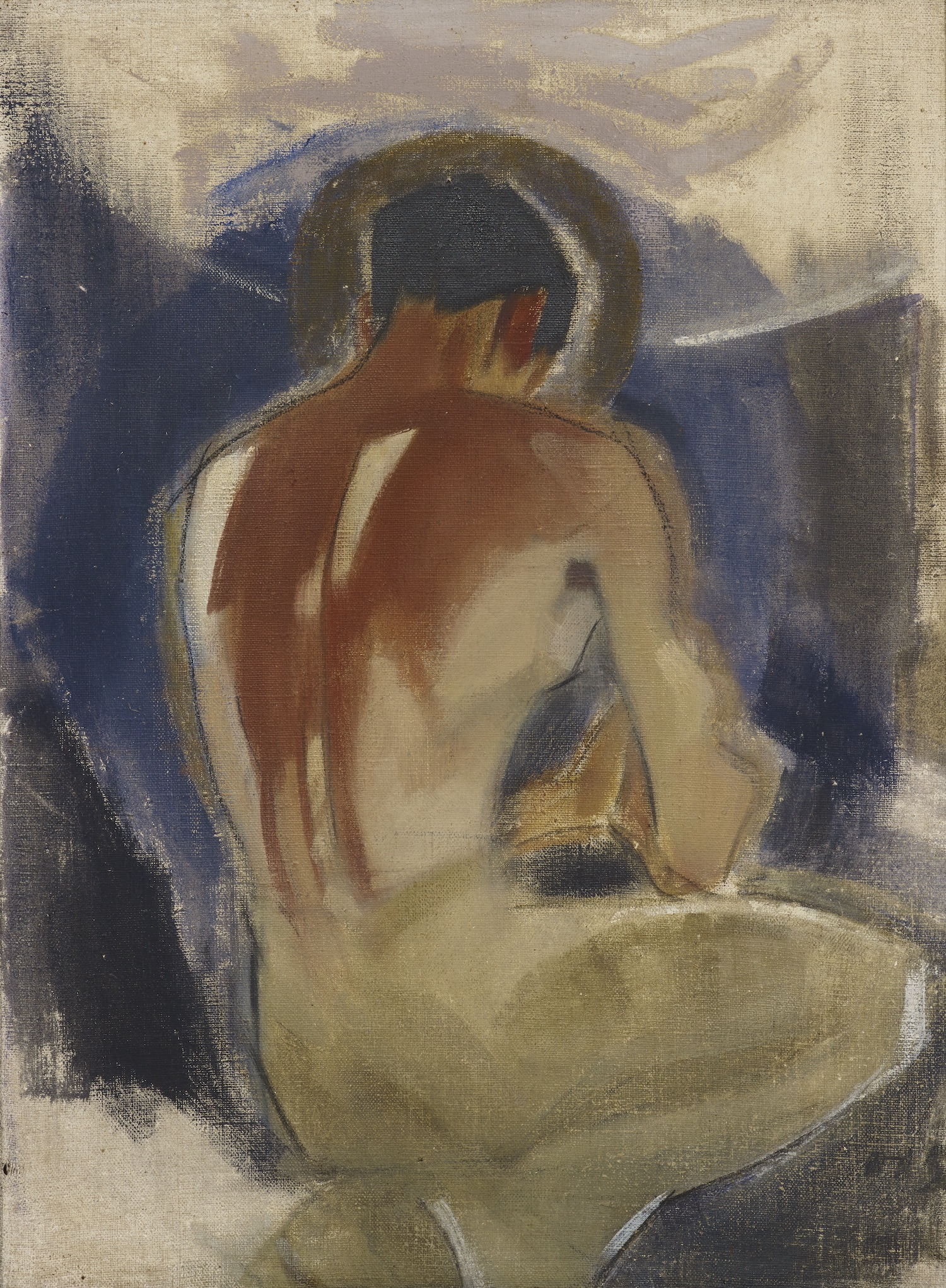
Robber at the Gate of Paradise, 1924 (fi)

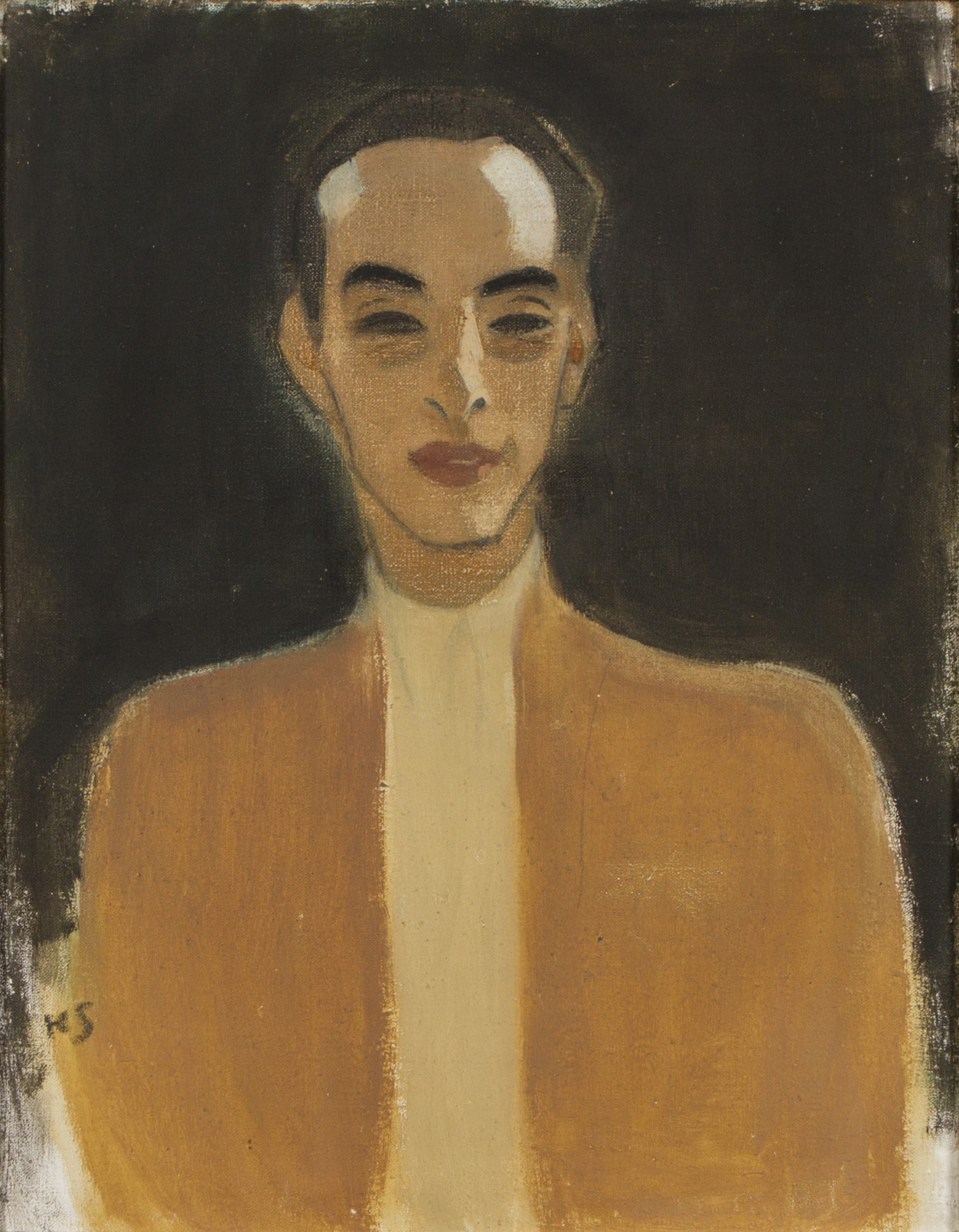
Actor, Matti Kiianlinna, 1926
(he became a friend of Helene until his untimely death in 1931)

== Later years and death ==
After her mother's death in 1923, Schjerfbeck settled in the coastal town of Ekenäs, where she remained for much of the following decade. When the Winter War broke out in December 1939, she moved to a farm in Tenala for about a year, returning to Ekenäs in mid-1940. She later moved to a nursing home, and from early 1942 to the Luontola sanatorium in Nummela. In February 1944, with Stenman's help, she travelled to Sweden and spent her final years at the Saltsjöbaden spa hotel, where she continued to paint actively, including the series of late self-portraits.

She died on January 23, 1946, and was buried at the Hietaniemi Cemetery in Helsinki.

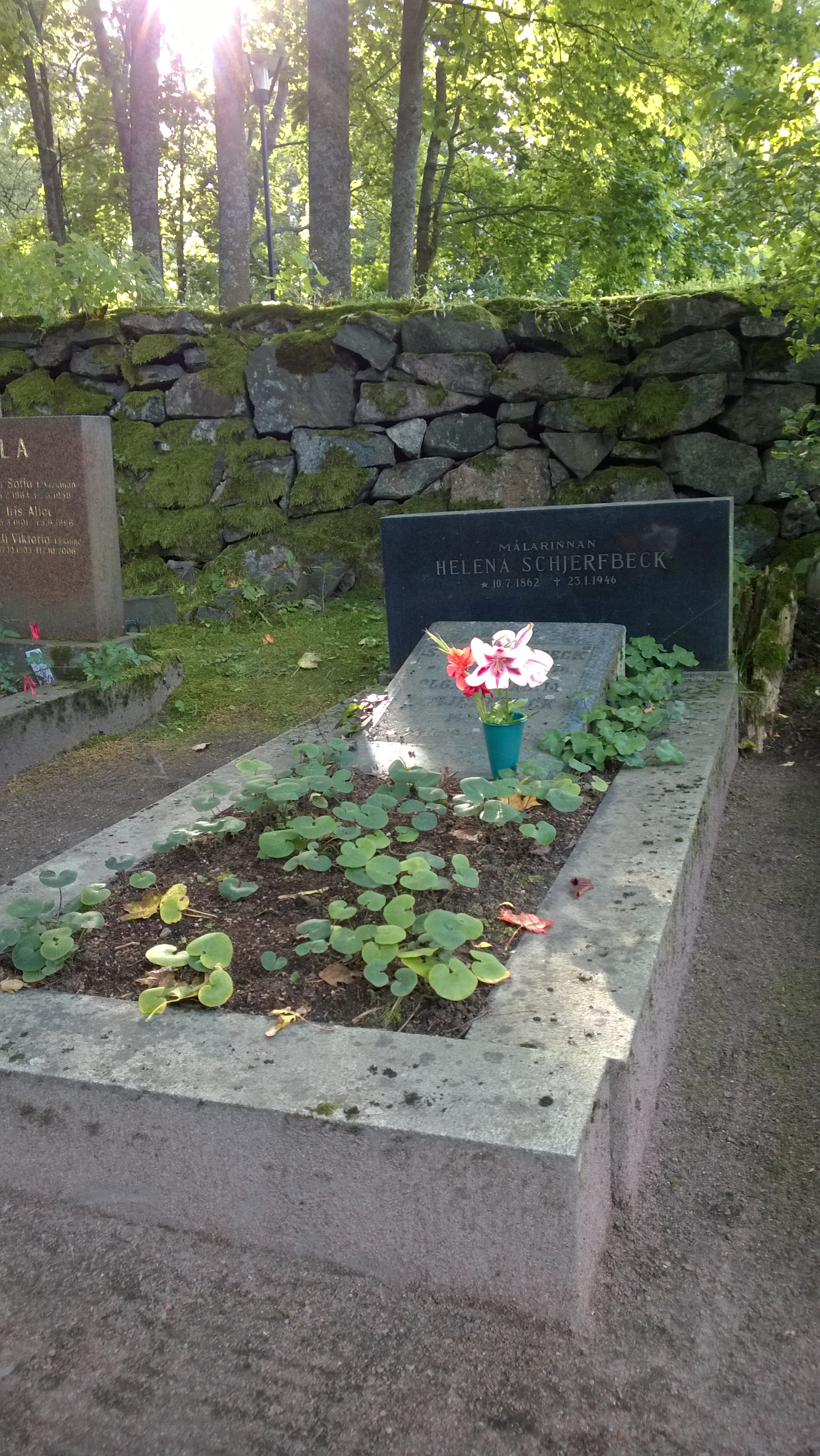
Grave at Hietaniemi Cemetery

== Work ==
Dancing Shoes is one of Schjerfbeck's most popular paintings and she returned to the theme three times, and executed a lithograph of it that catapulted the painting to international fame. It depicts her cousin Esther Lupander, who had extremely long legs, which led to the painting being nicknamed "The Grasshopper". Executed in Realist style, the painting shows the clear influence of Schjerfbeck's stay in Paris, where she had expressed admiration for Édouard Manet, Edgar Degas, Berthe Morisot, and Mary Cassatt. It fetched £3,044,500 at a 2008 Sotheby's London sale.

Girl with Blonde Hair (1916) is an example of Schjerfbeck's mature style, drawing on French Modernism. The work belongs to a series (including also The Family Heirloom of the same year) depicting neighbours of Schjerfbeck, Jenny and Impi Tamlander, who ran errands for Schjerfbeck and her mother and helped look after the family home. Here the sitter is Impi. The painting realized £869,000 at a 2015 Sotheby's London sale. Schjerfbeck's work was included in the 2018 exhibition Women in Paris 1850–1900.

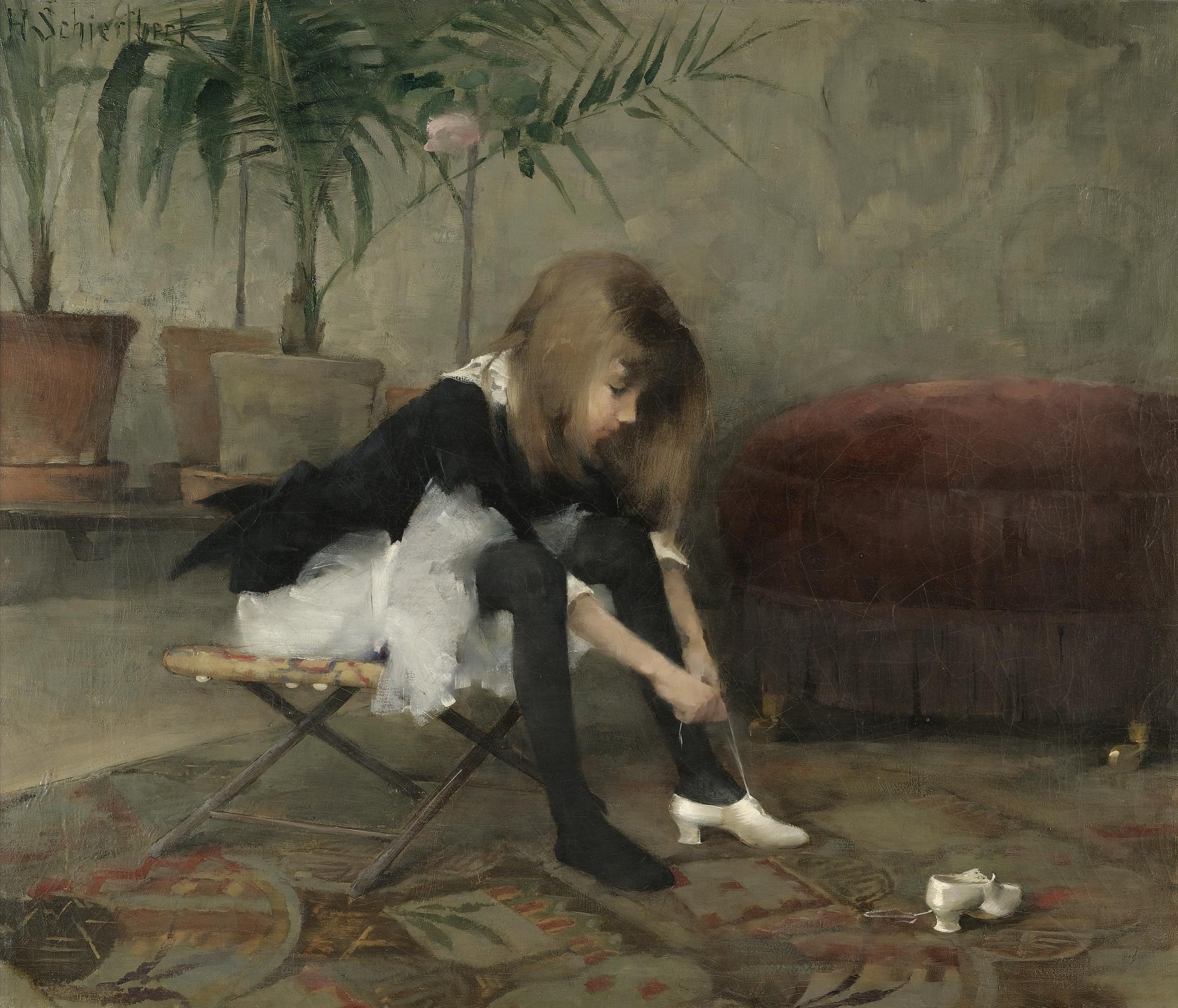
Dancing Shoes, 1882.

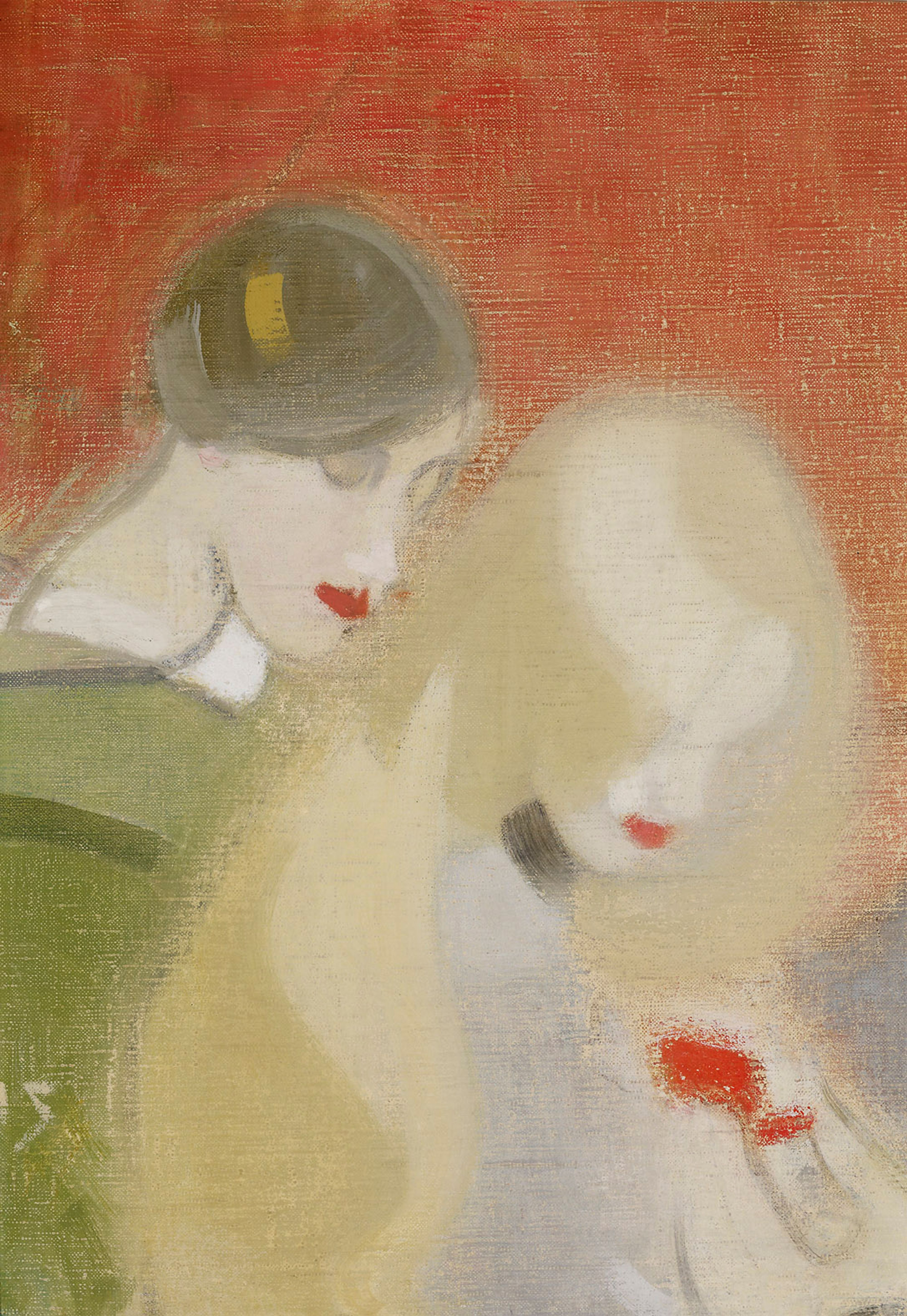
The Family Heirloom, 1916.

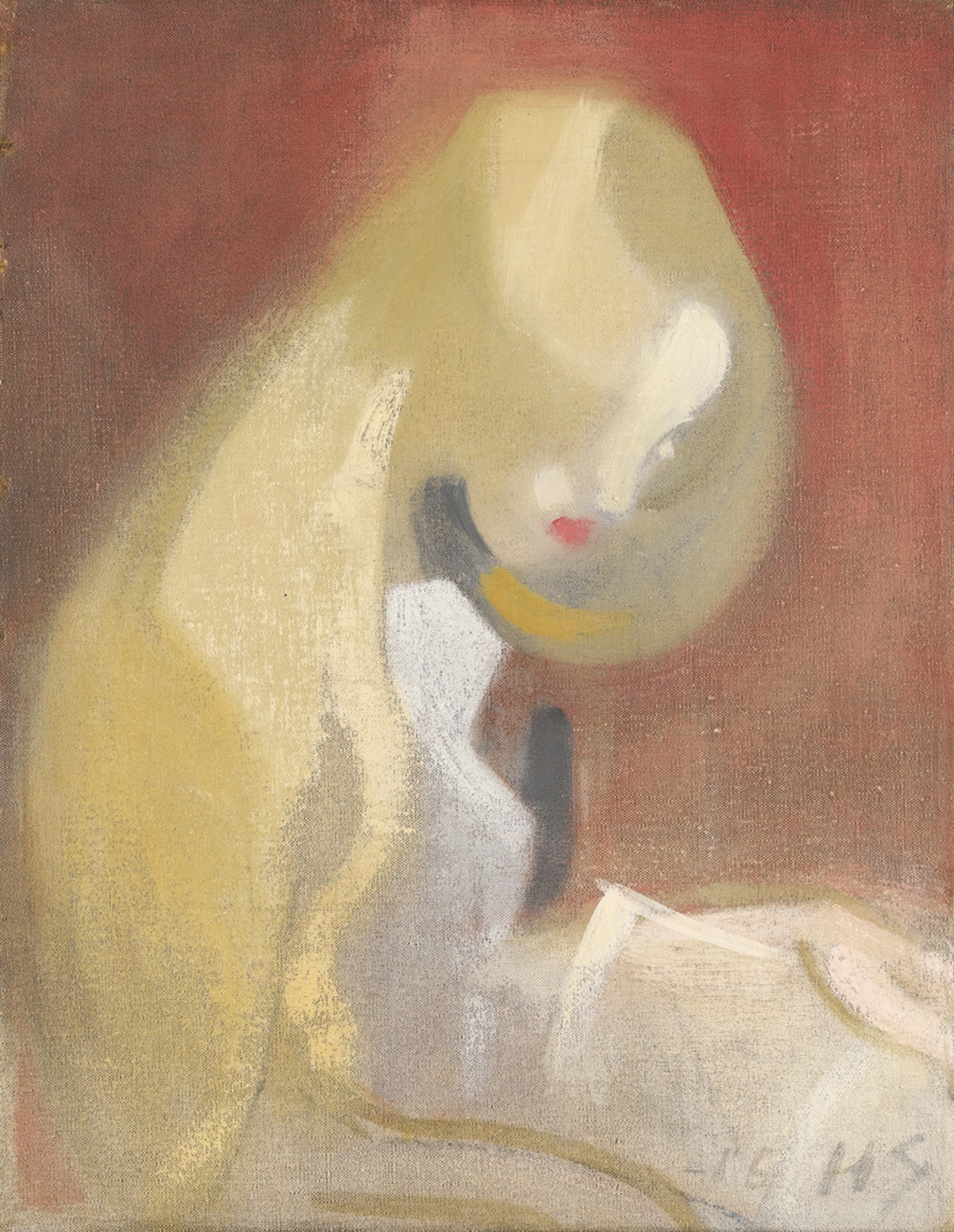
Girl with Blonde Hair, 1916. (fi)

== Legacy ==
Art forger Veli Seppä was an admirer of her works, and writes of his time forging them: "By encroaching on Schjerfbeck I felt like I had violated something sacred. It was if I had broken into a sacristy to steal the church silver." Fellow forger and self-admitted seller of 60 Schjerfbeck counterfeits Jouni Ranta was more critical and considered that her fame was undeserved.

The portrayal of Schjerfbeck in Einar Reuter's 1953 biography — published under his pseudonym H. Ahtela — as a fragile and suffering figure had a particularly strong and lasting influence on how she and her work were interpreted. Scholars have since argued that this image is misleading: Schjerfbeck had a deep and intense emotional life and engaged actively with the art of her time.

The 2003 biographical novel Helene by Rakel Liehu was a critical and commercial success, and won the 2004 Runeberg Prize. It also formed the basis of a 2020 film by the same name, directed by Antti Jokinen and starring Laura Birn as Schjerfbeck, which was nominated for an award in the feature-length category at the Shanghai International Film Festival.

=== International exhibitions ===
- In 1992, the National Academy of Design in Manhattan held an exhibition of Schjerfbeck's work.
- From 20 July to 27 October 2019, the Royal Academy exhibited her work in Helene Schjerfbeck, an exhibition with over 60 paintings, landscapes and still lifes, remarking the evolution of her career. The exhibit was the first major exhibition of her work in the UK and was organized by the Royal Academy and the Ateneum Art Museum / Finnish National Gallery, Helsinki.
- From December 5, 2025 to April 5, 2026, the Metropolitan Museum of Art exhibited her work in Seeing Silence: The Paintings of Helene Schjerfbeck. The exhibition included works made over the course of her career and was her first major museum exhibit in the United States — a presentation that had been planned as early as 1939 but was cancelled owing to the outbreak of the Second World War. The exhibit was organized by the Museum in collaboration with the Finnish National Gallery / Ateneum Art Museum. The Metropolitan Museum of Art owns Schjerfbeck's 1920 painting, The Lace Shawl. In connection with the exhibition, the Met collaborated with Finnish Design Shop on the Tones of Modernism collection, featuring pieces by Finnish design brands Artek, Iittala, Nikari, Lapuan Kankurit and Hetkinen, their creation inspired by Schjerfbeck's paintings. The exhibition was praised in Vogue, The New York Times, and other publications.

== See also ==
- Golden Age of Finnish Art
- Art in Finland
