= Ada Thilén =

Finnish painter (1852–1933)

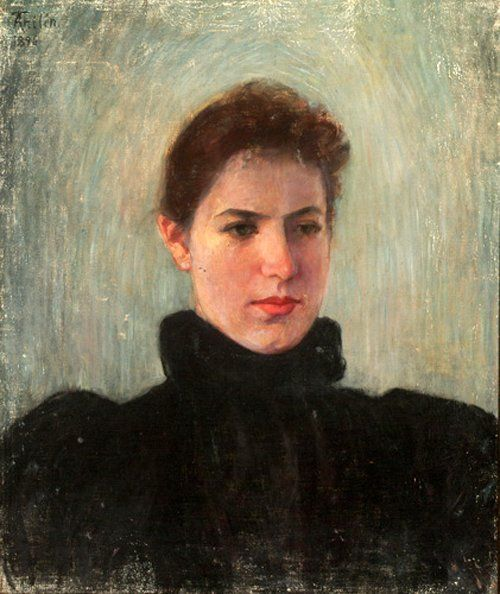
- self portrait
- Born: May 10, 1852; Kuopio
- Died: June 14, 1933 (aged 81); Helsinki
- Known for: landscapes

Ada Maria Thilén (May 10, 1852 – June 14, 1933) was a Finnish painter known for her landscapes.

== Life ==
Ada Thilén was born in Kuopio in 1852. Her left eye was damaged from birth, and she had to use a glass eye for the rest of her life. Her father was the Senate Treasury Chamber Councilor Julius Gustaf Reinhold Thilén (1812–1887) and her mother was Vilhelmina Angelika Elisabet Ehrnrooth (1827–1890). Thilén studied with the Finnish-Swedish painter Hjalmar Munsterhjelm at the Royal Swedish Academy of Arts in Stockholm and under Léon Bonnat and Jean-Léon Gérôme in Paris. She went on painting trips, including Brittany in 1886.

Thilén participated in exhibitions of Finnish Artists in 1893, 1895, 1897, 1900, 1901, 1903, 1906 and 1924. Thilén painted landscapes and portraits in oils and also worked in pastel and watercolor. Her works are stylistically representative of French realism of the 1880s, which also had Italian influences. The Finnish National biography believes that her profile is less than her contemporaries because of her modesty and because she has not attracted the same level of academic interest.

In 1896 she painted her own self portrait. She continued to use a glass eye and this did not seem to affect her success as an artist.

She had a long friendship with three other female artists: Helene Schjerfbeck, Maria Wiik and Helena Westermarck (with whom she once shared a studio). These Swedish and Finnish female painters all studied together between 1876 and 1878 under Professor Adolf von Becker.

She debuted as an artist in 1876, initially representing landscapes, with an idealistic and romantic vision of art, influenced by her first teachers. In 1880 she began to study in Paris at the Trélat Academy, where she had the French painters Léon Bonnat and Jean-Léon Gérôme as professors. Other Finnish artists studying in the Parisian academy at the time included Helene Schjerfbeck, Helena Westermarck, Ellen Favorin and Alma Engblom, who along with Thilén, went on to study at the Académie Colarossi, under the tutelage of realist salon artists Gustave Courtois and Louis-Joseph-Raphaël Collin.

Her Parisian teachers, along with the influence exerted on her by the Finnish painters Fanny Churberg and Hilda Granstedt during the summer of 1880, were key in Thilén's evolution towards portrait painting and the typical French realism of the time, with Italian influences, which is reflected in her most famous work, The Blue Bell Girl of 1890. Thilén used oil paints, as well as watercolors and pastels, and her works were usually small in size and nature-themed. Her work is characterized by simplicity, emotion and mastery of drawing and color. In 1896 Thilén painted her self-portrait. She made trips to several destinations, in which she dedicated herself to painting landscapes and portraits.

== Gallery ==
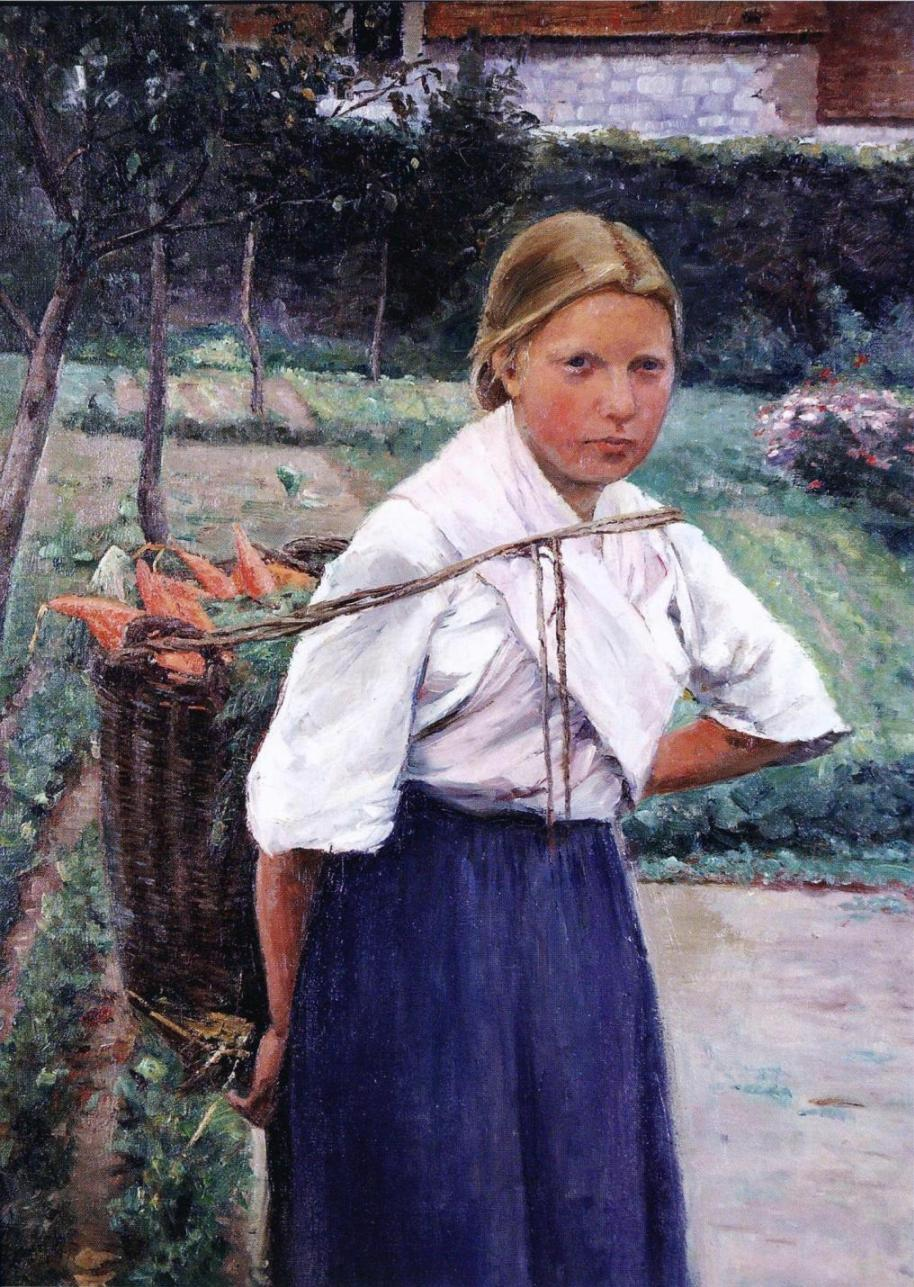
Porkkanoita kantava tyttö (hacia 1889)

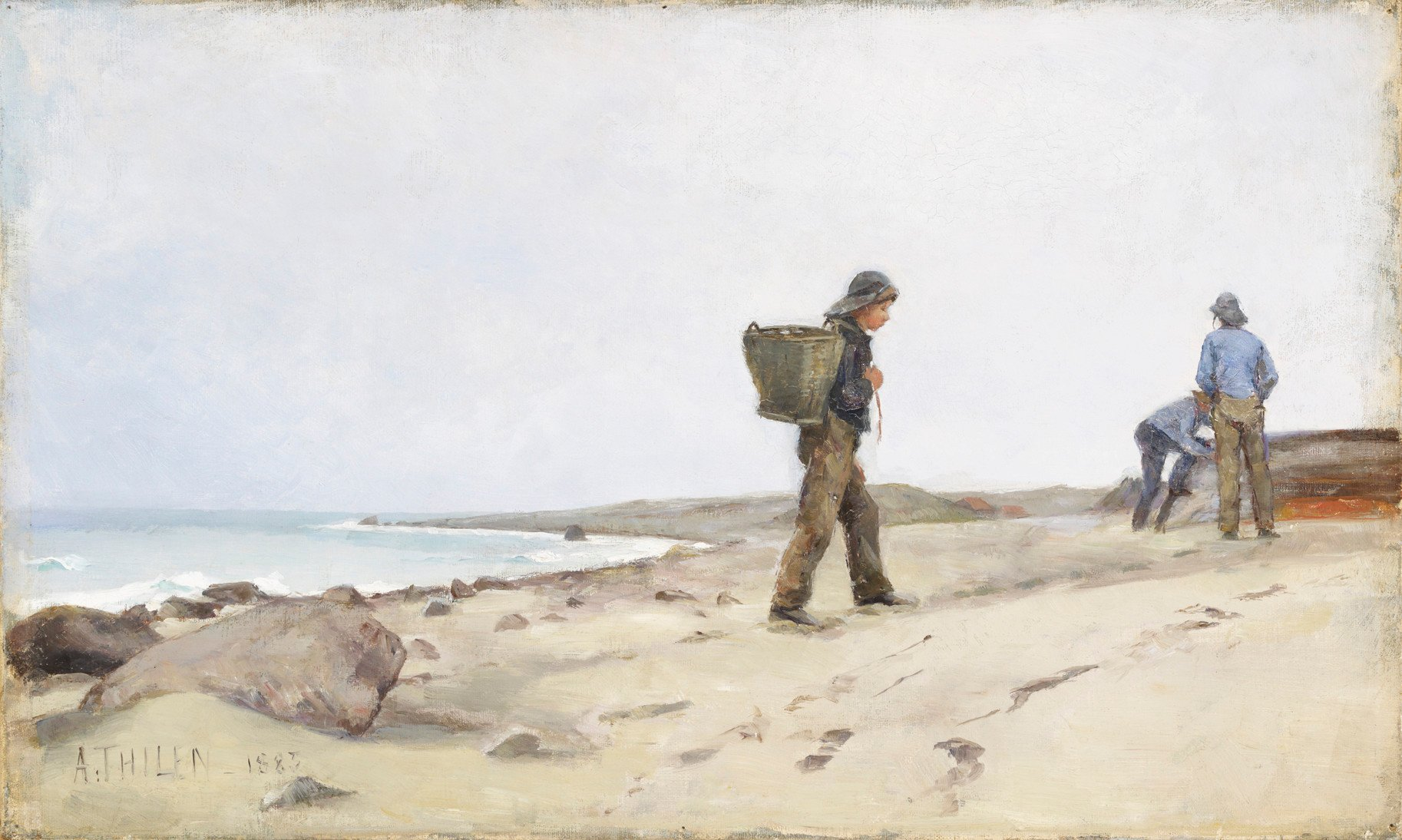
Oyster Pickers (1885)

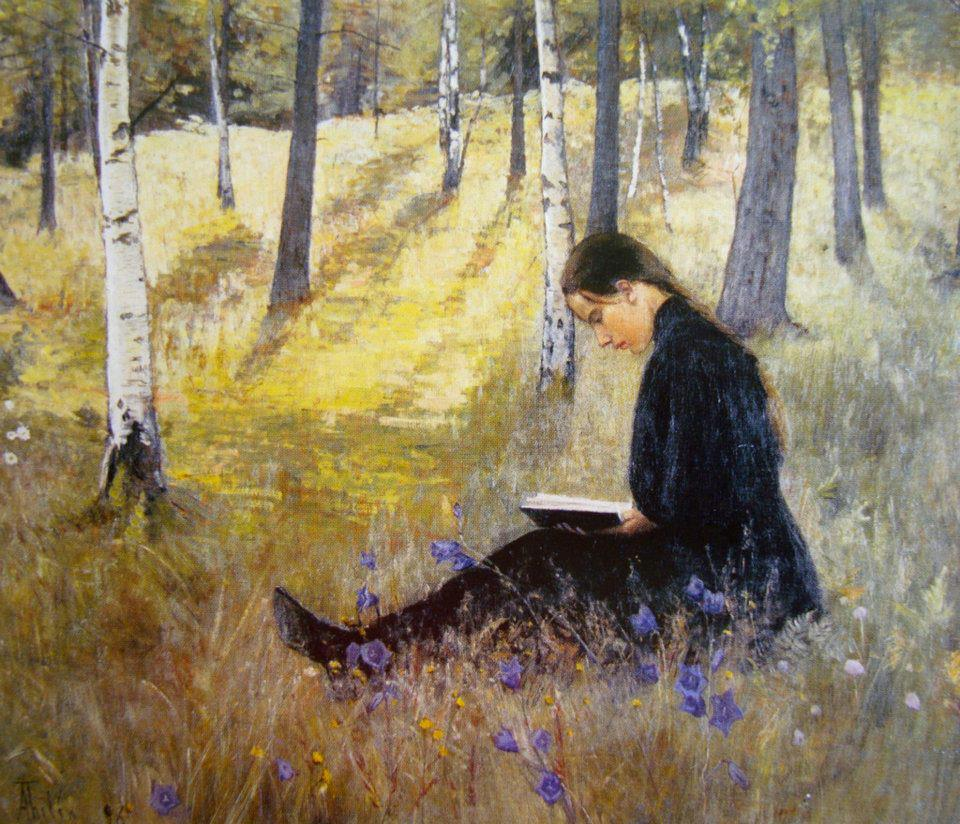
Girl Reading in a Landscape (1896)

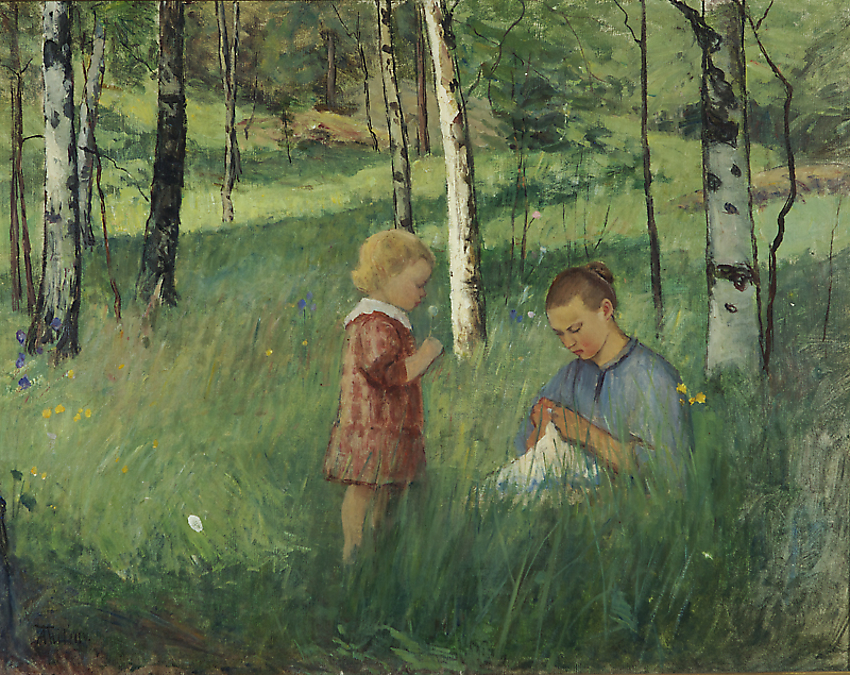
Small Chores

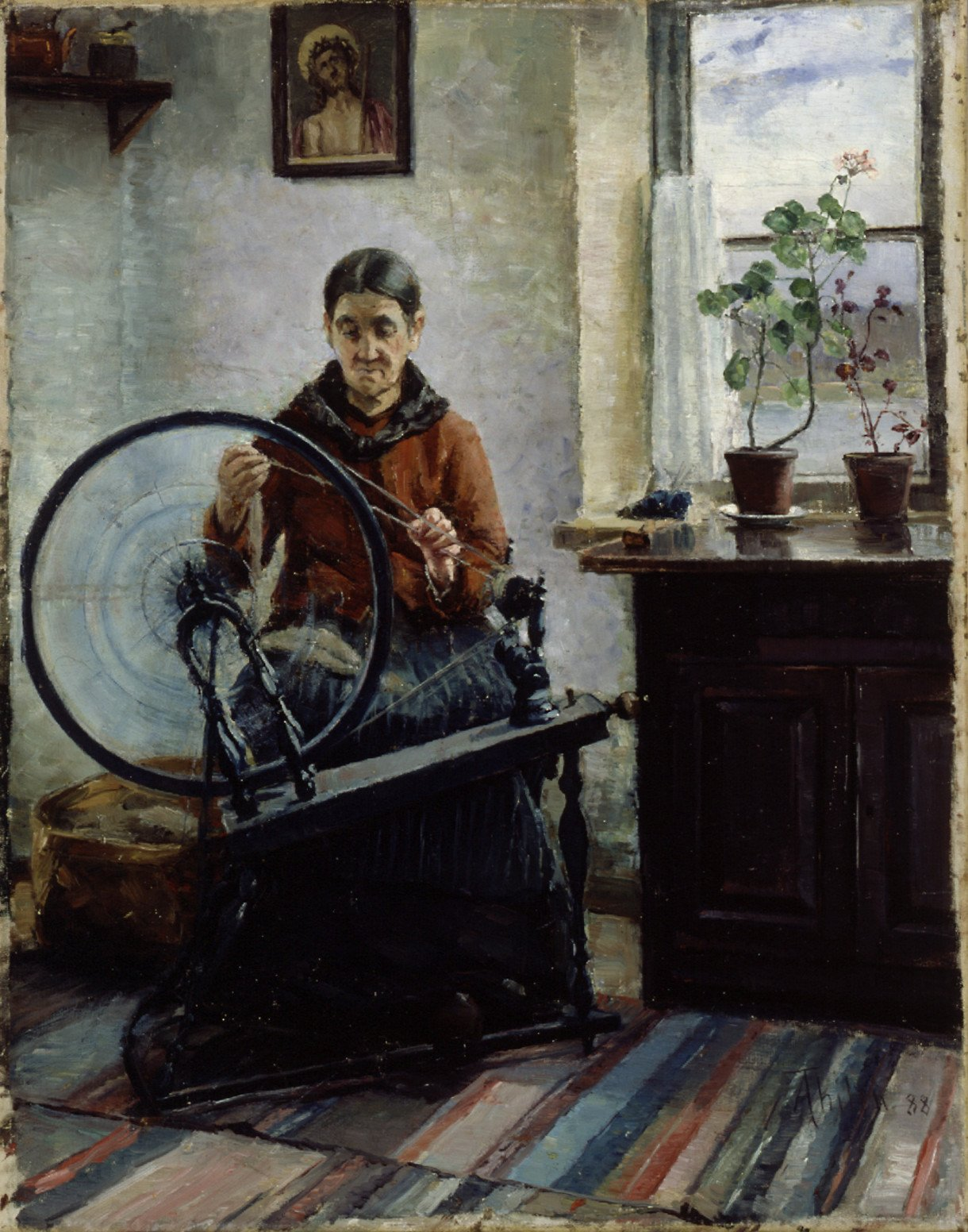
At the Spinning Wheel (1888)

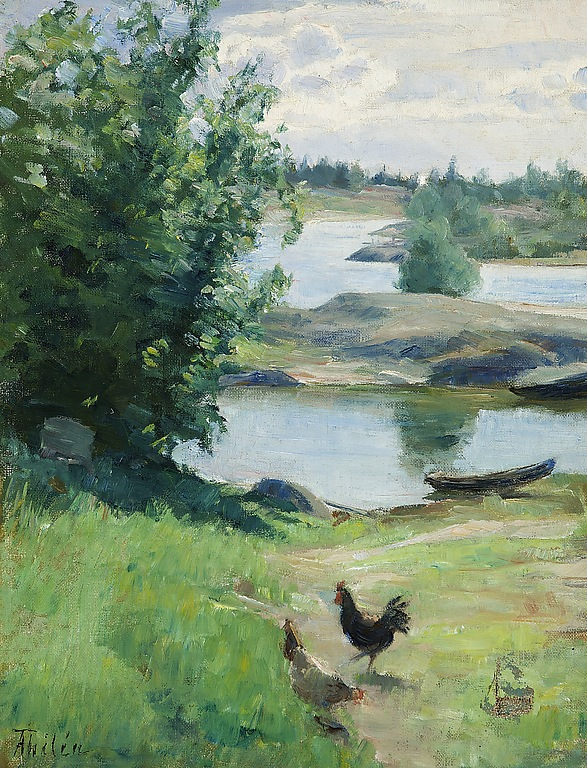
Rooster and Chicken
