= The Old Manor (painting) =

1901 painting by Helene Schjerfbeck

- Den gamla herrgården (Swedish), Vanha herraskartano (Finnish)
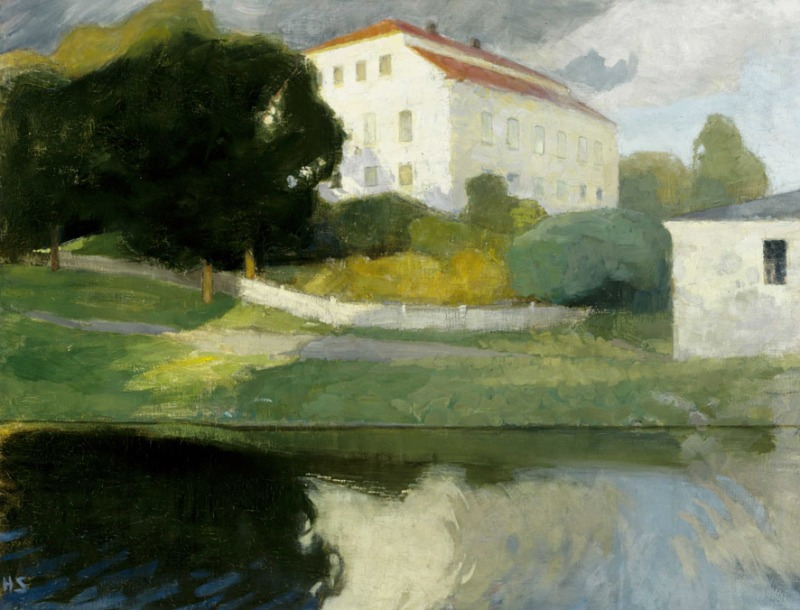
- Artist: Helene Schjerfbeck
- Year: 1901
- Medium: Oil on canvas
- Movement: Impressionism
- Subject: Sjundby Manor
- Dimensions: 34,5 cm × 47 cm (136 in × 19 in)
- Location: Turku Art Museum, Turku, Finland
- Owner: Turku Art Museum
- Accession: 74

The Old Manor (Swedish: Den gamla herrgården, Finnish: Vanha herraskartano) is an oil painting on canvas by Finnish artist Helene Schjerfbeck, completed in 1901. Part of the Turku Art Museum collections, the painting measures 47 × 34.5 cm and depicts the historical Sjundby Manor located in Siuntio, Uusimaa region.

The painting, usually on display at Turku Art Museum, was featured in Schjerfbeck's Seeing Silence exhibition at the MET in New York City in 2025-2026.

== History ==
Sjundby Manor was a place dear to Schjerfbeck; it was her grandmother's home and her second home during her childhood and youth. This manor house, completed in the 16th century, is situated along the Siuntio River, between the lakes of Vikträsk and Tjusträsk. The building began to appear in Schjerfbeck's art early on; the first drawings of the subject were created in 1875 when the artist was only a young teenager.

Sjundby was the home of Schjerfbeck's grandmother, Sofia Printz, and from the beginning of the 18th century until the end of the 19th century, the manor house was held by the Adlercreutz family, to whom the artist was related. Schjerfbeck's aunt Selma was married to the lord of the manor, Thomas Adlercreutz, and the family's last lord of the manor, Henrik Tomas Adlercreutz, was Helene's godfather. The close connection to the place remained later in life, as the manor's heiress, Selma Adlercreutz, was the artist's favorite cousin.

== Paintings of Sjundby ==
Schjerfbeck painted several variations of Sjundby Manor, of which The Old Manor House is the most famous. Other notable oil paintings created in Siuntio include:

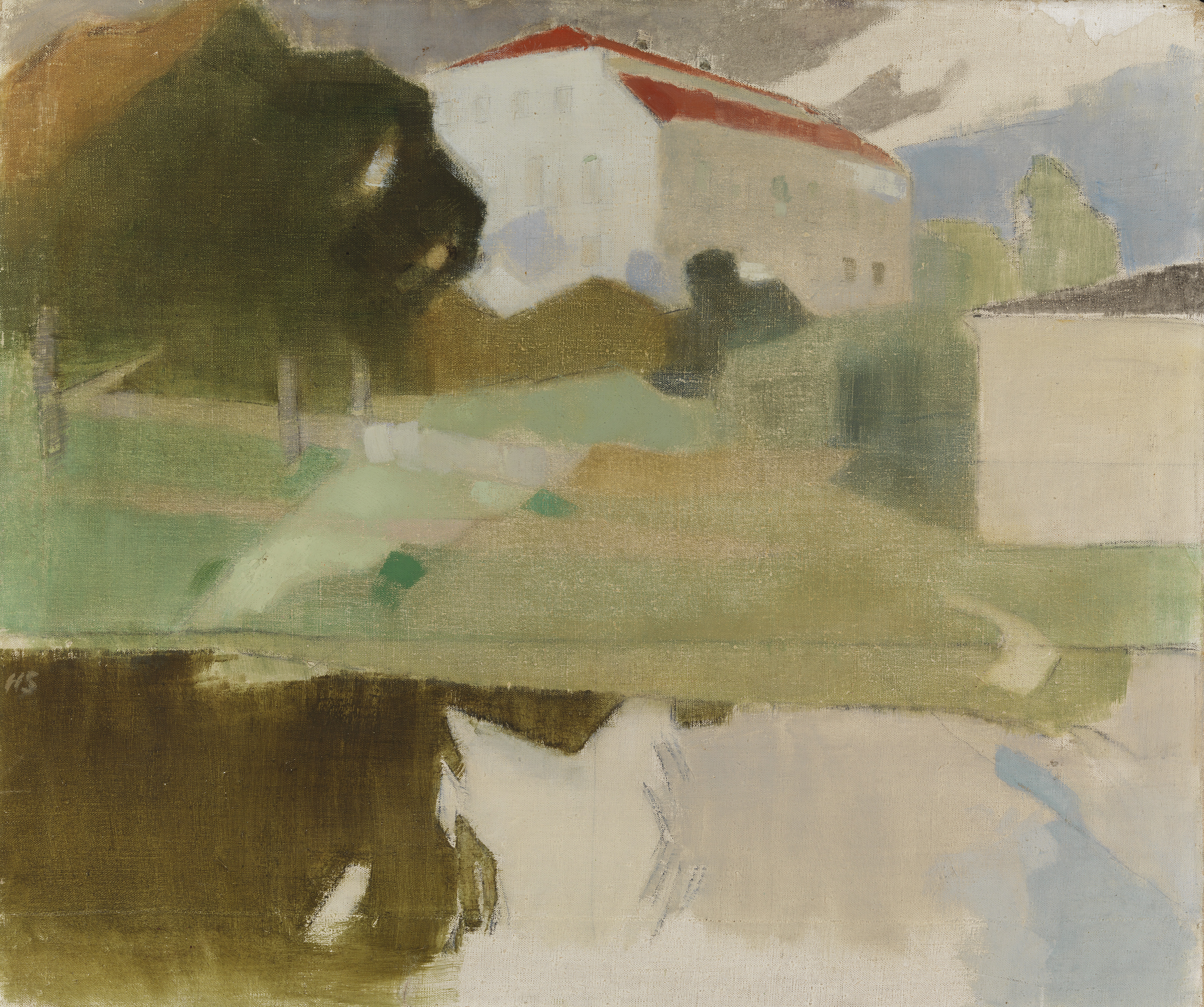
Schjerbeck's painting Sjundby Manor (1927).

- Boat in a Lily Pond (1883)
- The Park Bench (1883), which depicts the castle grounds
- Karin Månsdotter's Bedchamber (1890), oil on panel
- Sjundby Manor (1927), oil on canvas

Several pencil drawings documenting life at Sjundby have been preserved in the artist's earliest sketchbooks from 1872 to 1880. These sketches feature figures such as her grandmother and her godfather Henrik Adlercreutz, illustrating that the castle served as a constant source of inspiration and observation for the artist.
