= Önningeby artists' colony =

Finnish artists colony

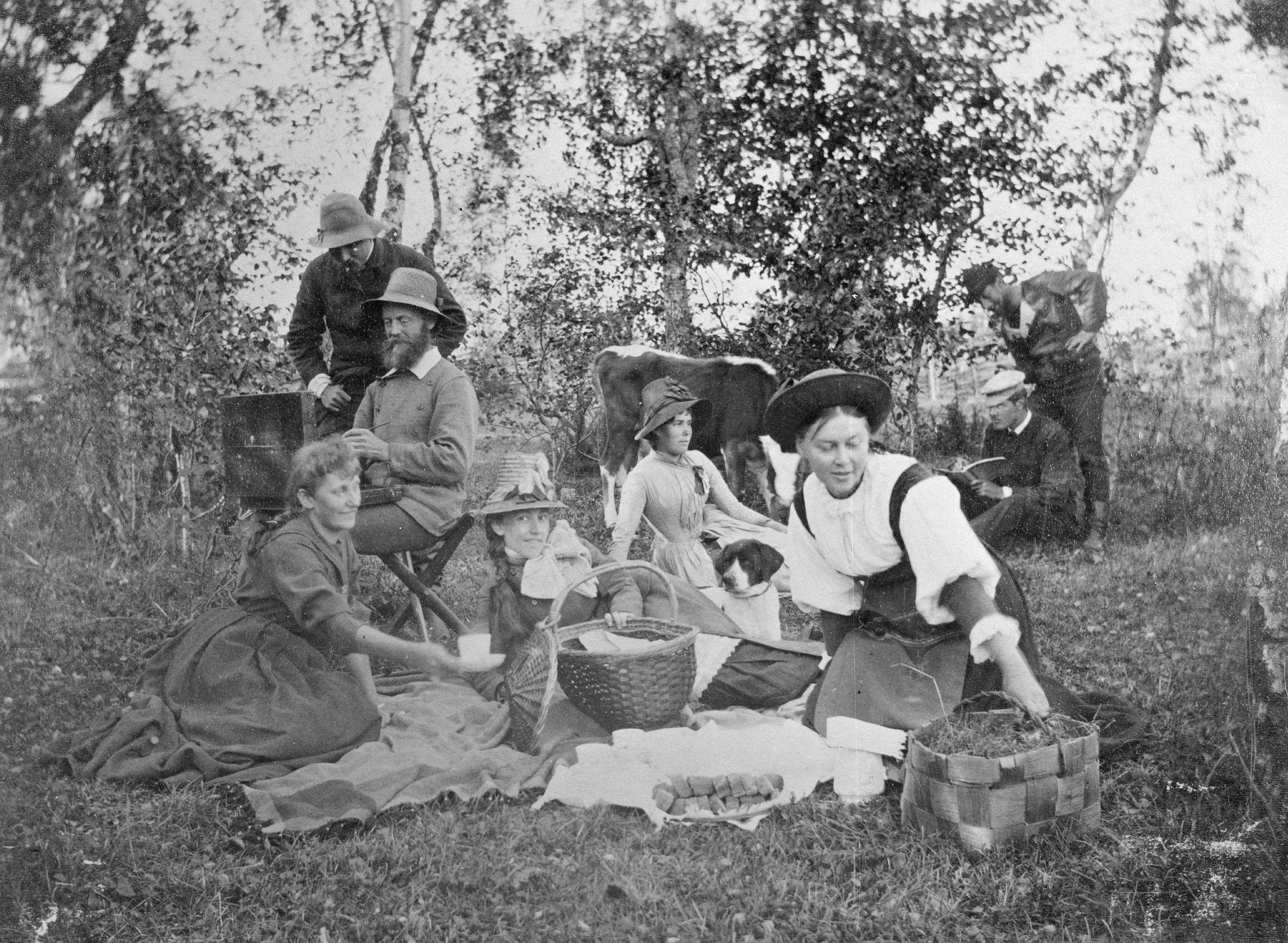
Artists at Önningeby in 1886. On the front from left: Hanna Rönnberg, Hilma Westerholm, Elin Danielson and Nina Ahlstedt. Behind them sitting in the chair Fredrik Ahlstedt and standing by him Victor Westerholm. Sitting on the ground in the back Alex Federley and standing behind him J. A. G. Acke.

The Önningeby artists' colony (Swedish: Önningebykolonin) was founded in 1886 by Victor Westerholm, a Finnish landscape painter, who had a summer house in the village of Önningeby in Åland in the Baltic Sea. It attracted Finnish and Swedish artists who gathered in the summer to paint landscapes en plein air rather than in their studios. Many of the participating artists were women. In total over 30 artists participated in the colony.

== Background ==
In the 1870s, European artists began to develop an interest in painting outdoors rather than in their studios. Formal approaches to landscape painting gave way to more realistic or naturalistic depictions, often reflecting the effects of changing light. Throughout Europe, artists began to gather each summer in villages where they could work together in pleasant surroundings. Artists from across Scandinavia met above all in Skagen in the north of Denmark from the early 1880s, forming a group which became known as the Skagen Painters.

In the mid-1880s, the Finnish Impressionist painter Victor Westerholm from Turku bought Tomtebo, a little summer house beside the Lemström Canal in the village of Önningeby to the northeast of Mariehamn. While studying in Düsseldorf, he had met Anders August Jansson (1859–1882) from Åland who encouraged him to visit the islands in 1880. In 1885, he exhibited paintings at the Helsinki salon including October day on Åland. From 1886, he invited his artist friends to join him there each summer to paint in the open air. Their works included marine landscapes and village scenes as well as portraits of the local inhabitants. They also painted each other.

== Participants ==
Many of the artists who painted in Önningeby were women. The first group of artists to join Westerholm included Fredrik Ahlstedt and his wife Nina, who both arrived already in May 1886, followed by Aleksander Federley, Hanna Rönnberg and Elin Danielson, all of whom were Finns. The Swedish painter J.A.G. Acke also participated the first year, becoming one of the group's most important and somewhat central figures, returning each year until 1892 when interest began to fade. However, Acke's period is considered the liveliest in the colony's history. Foundation of the colony immediately became known in Finland. On July 29 of 1886 the newspaper Åbo Underrättelser reported about the new colony in a small village of Ålands.

Other painters who joined the group in subsequent years include the Finns Elias Muukka, Elin Alfhild Nordlund, Helmi Sjöstrand and Dora Wahlroos, and the Swedes Ida Gisiko, Anna Wengberg, Eva Topelius, and Edvard Westman. Ellen Favorin and Amélie Lundahl visited in 1889. In early 1900s a number of Estonian artists and writers also visited the colony. Most of visitors were accommodated at the village farms.

=== Hanna Rönnberg ===
One of the most important members of the group was Hanna Rönnberg. She first visited in 1886 and returned year after year. Together with Victor Westerholm she was the most frequent participant in the colony. Both a writer and a painter, she contributed to the colony's success by including it in her fictional and non-fictional writings. Her paintings often included people, her best works appearing around 1890, some achieving success at exhibitions. Thereafter she concentrated increasingly on her short story collections including Från Ålands skär and Brovaktens historier. In 1888, Edvard Westman invited her to join him in Denmark. They met in Copenhagen and together visited the artists colony in Skagen. For a time they planned to marry but never did.

=== J.A.G. Acke ===
Johan Axel Gustaf Andersson, better known as J.A.G. Acke, was the first Swede to visit the Önningeby where he painted some of his best works during the three summers he was there. He stayed at the Övre Knapans farm where the large dining hall became his studio. He painted portraits of the farm's hostess "Knapans farmor" (Knapan's grandmother) and of Victor Westerholm. He also painted landscapes, inspired by French impressionistic works playing with the effects of sunlight. It was in Önningeby that he met his wife to be, Eva Topelius, daughter of the writer Zacharias Topelius. After their marriage in 1891, they returned to Önningeby in the winter in February 1892. It was there he completed his enormous Snöljus (Snow Light) measuring 4.6 by 1.6 metres which he had hoped to exhibit in Paris, but it was refused.

=== List of the participants ===
- Victor Westerholm
- Fredrik Ahlstedt
- Nina Ahlstedt
- J.A.G. Acke
- Edvard Westman
- Elin Danielson
- Hanna Rönnberg
- Eva Acke
- Aleksander Federley
- Ida Gisiko-Spärck
- Anna Wengberg
- Elin Alfhild Nordlund
- Helmi Sjöstrand
- Dora Wahlroos
- Amélie Lundahl
- Ellen Favorin
- Agnes Wittfooth
- Vivi Munsterhjelm
- Hanna Svanström
- Sigrid Schauman
- Elias Muukka
- Carl Erik Törner
- Leo Belmonte
- Karl Moberg
- Juuso Putro
- Ali Munsterhjelm

The colony was active for seven years from 1886 till 1892, and the press actively reported about its life through Uno Godenhjelm. The visiting intensity decreased after that, though many artists still visited Önningeby in the beginning of 20th century. The colony dispersed at the start of the World War I, when Westerholms left Tomtebo in 1914.

== Museum ==
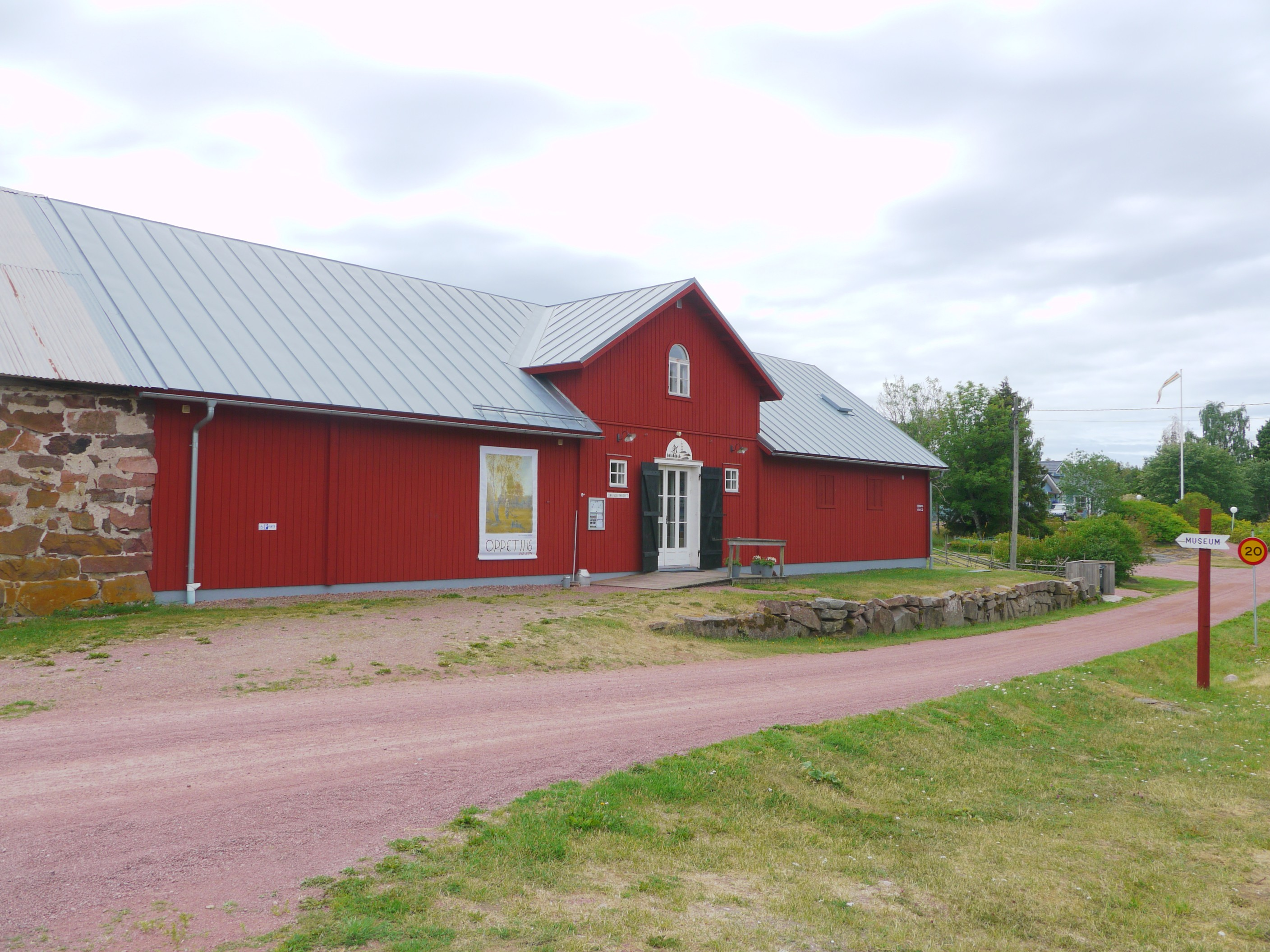
Önningeby-museet.

Over the years, the artists were accommodated in Önningeby's spacious farmsteads. One of these, the Jonesas farm, was converted into a museum which was opened in 1992 and expanded in 1999. The museum collection includes over 400 works. It exhibits paintings by a number of those who gathered in the artists colony. In 2022, an exhibition, dedicated to the colony artists, was open at the Waldemarsudde art museum in Stockholm. It largely consisted of the Önningeby Museum collections. A special exhibition dedicated to Ida Gisiko-Spärck, Anna Wengberg and Elin Alfhild Nordlund was organized at the museum in summer of 2023.

== Gallery of paintings ==
The gallery presents a selection of paintings by the Önningeby artists.

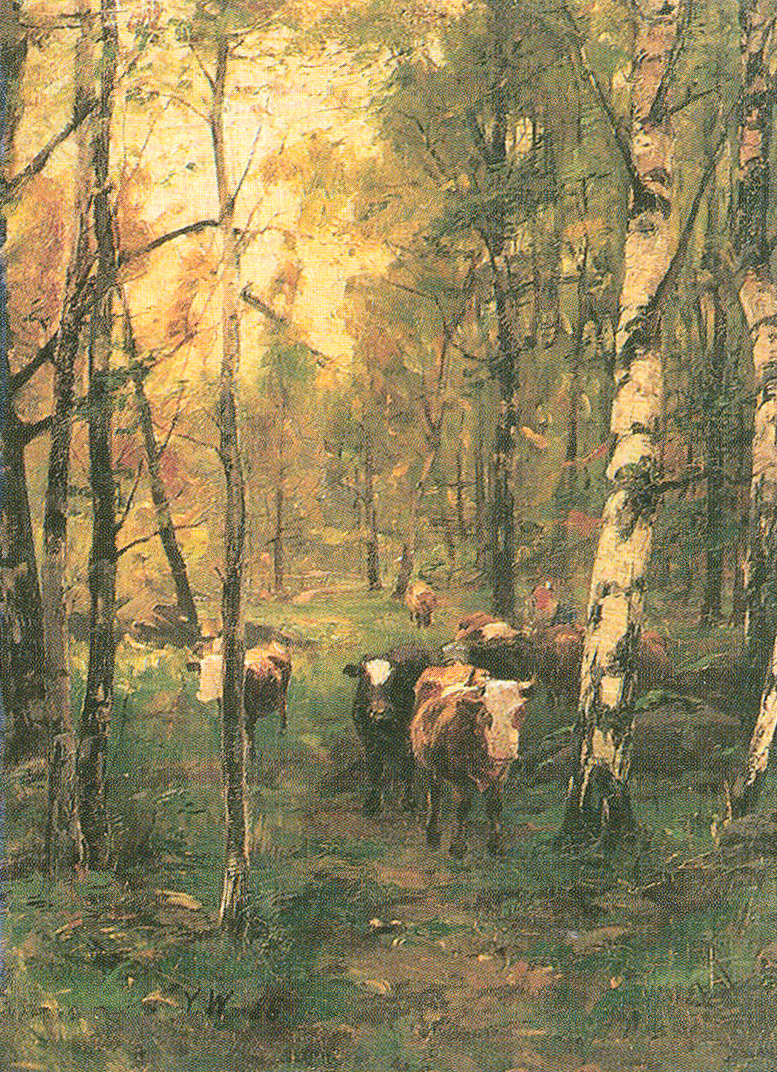
Kor i björkskog (Cows in a birch forest), Victor Westerholm, 1886

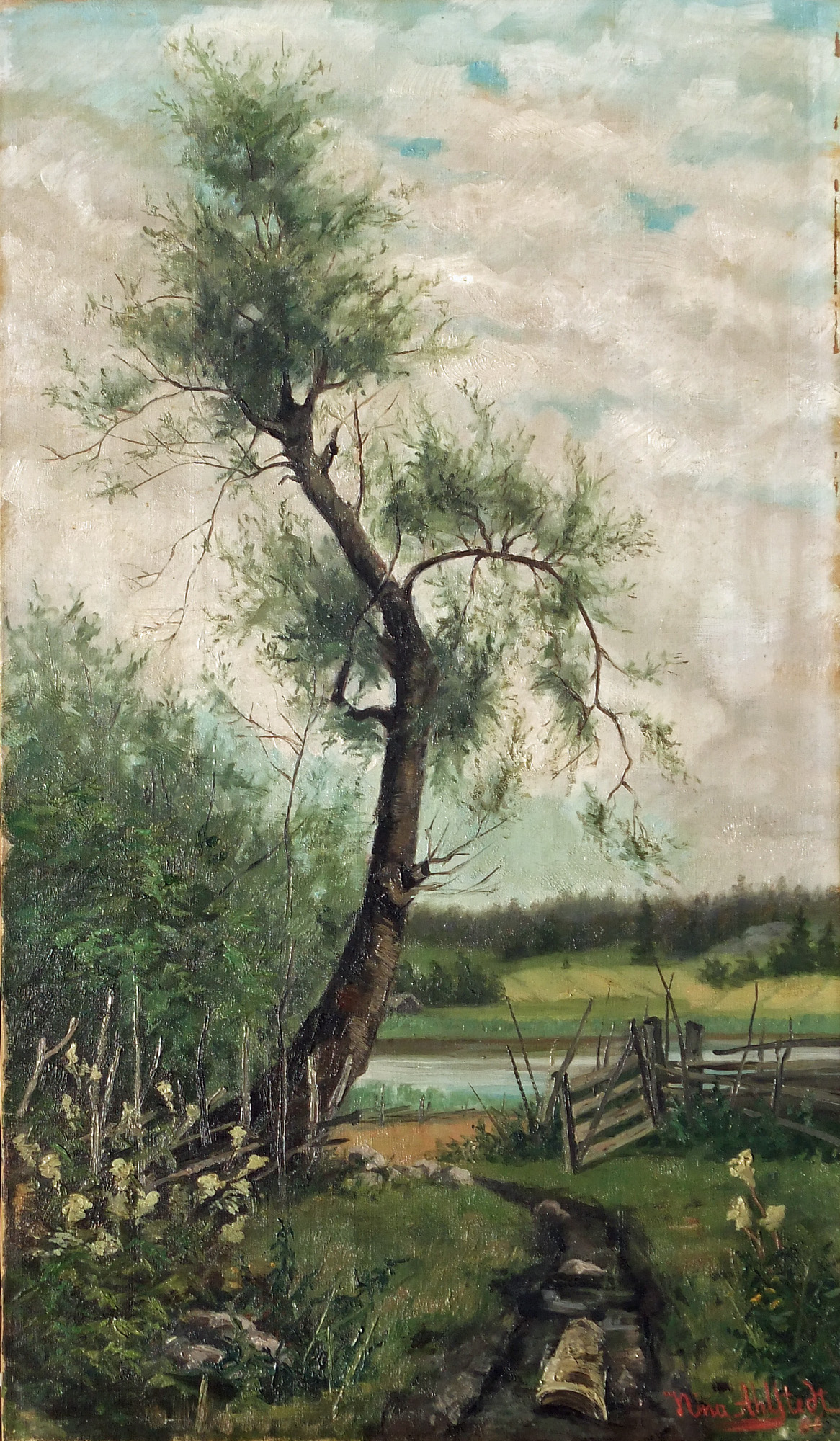
Grinden (The Gate), Nina Ahlstedt, 1886

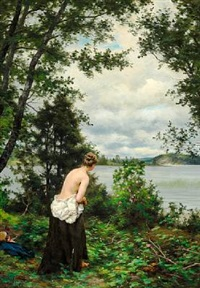
Sommar. Ved en vik... (Summer. By a Cove), Fredrik Ahlstedt, 1887

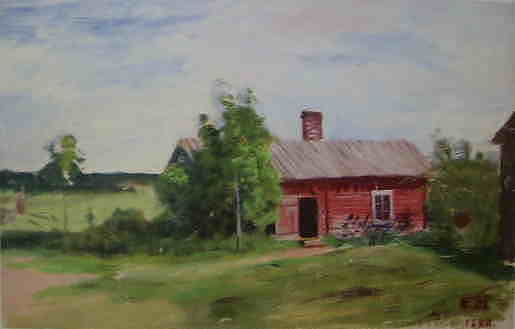
Uthus på Övre Knapans (Outhouse at Övre Knapans), Elias Muukka, 1888

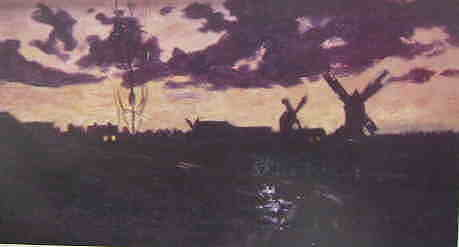
Natt i Önningeby (Night in Önningeby), 1888

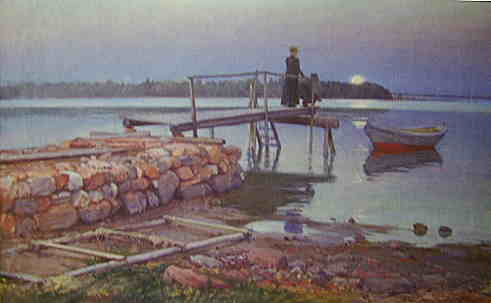
Bryggan vid Tomtebo (Jetty at Tomtebo), Elin Danielson

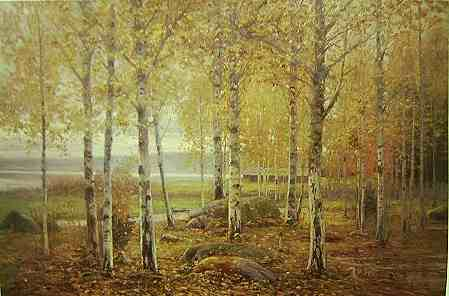
Strandlandskap (Shore Landscape), Edvard Westman

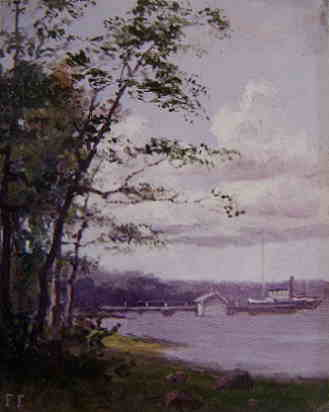
Lilla Holmen, Ellen Favorin, 1889

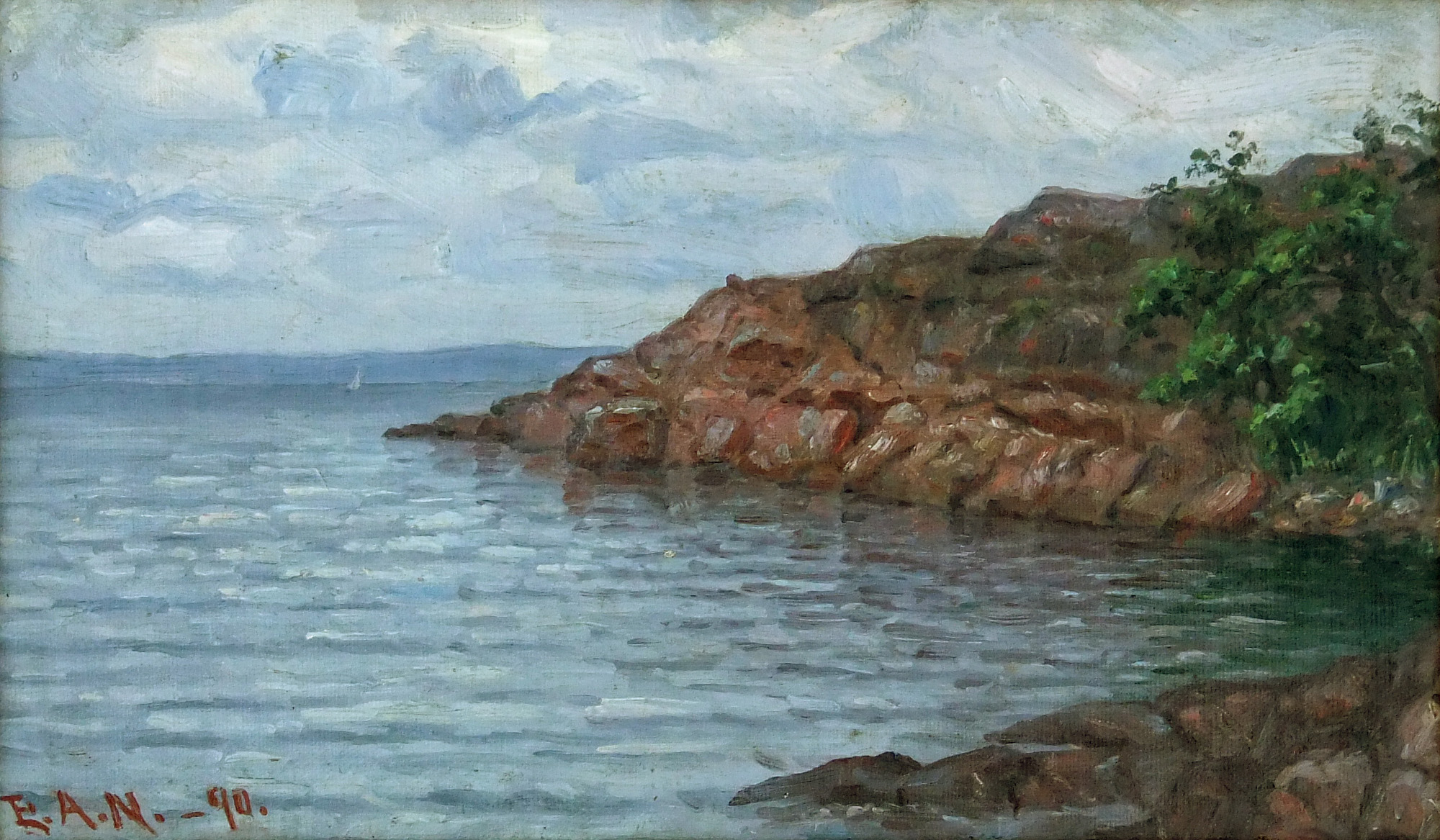
Främsnabba, Elin Afhild Nordlund, 1890

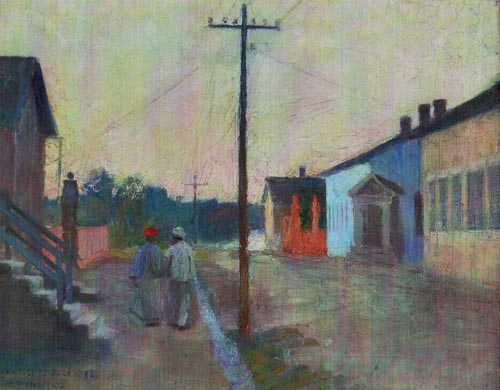
Kyrkogatan, Anna Wengberg, 1893

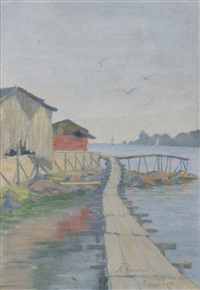
Shorescape, Hanna Rönnberg, 1890

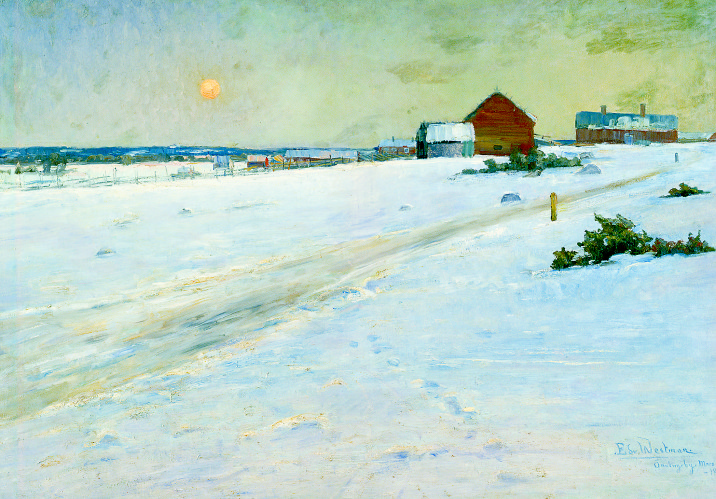
Onningeby Mars 1892, Edvard Westman

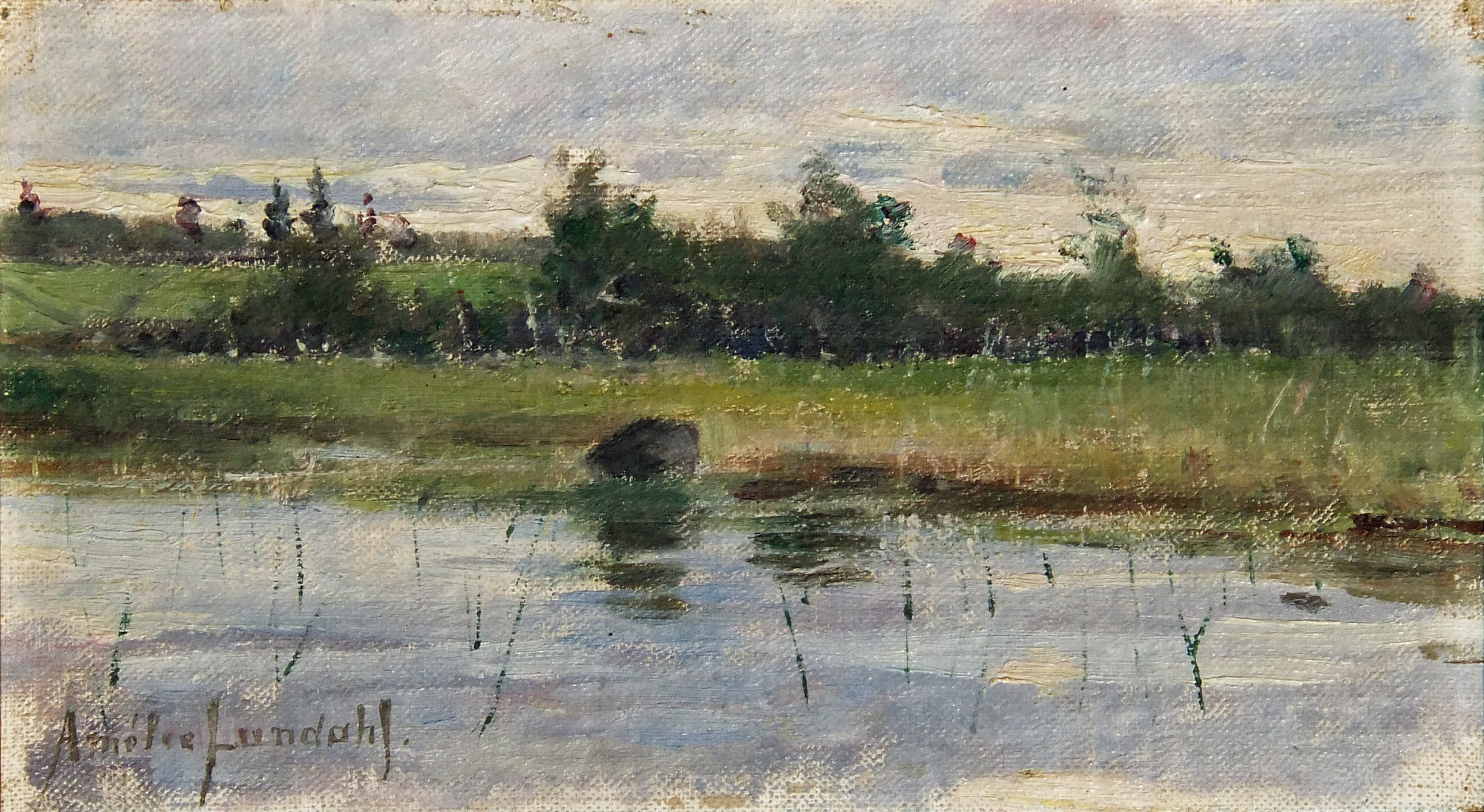
The Lake, Amélie Lundahl

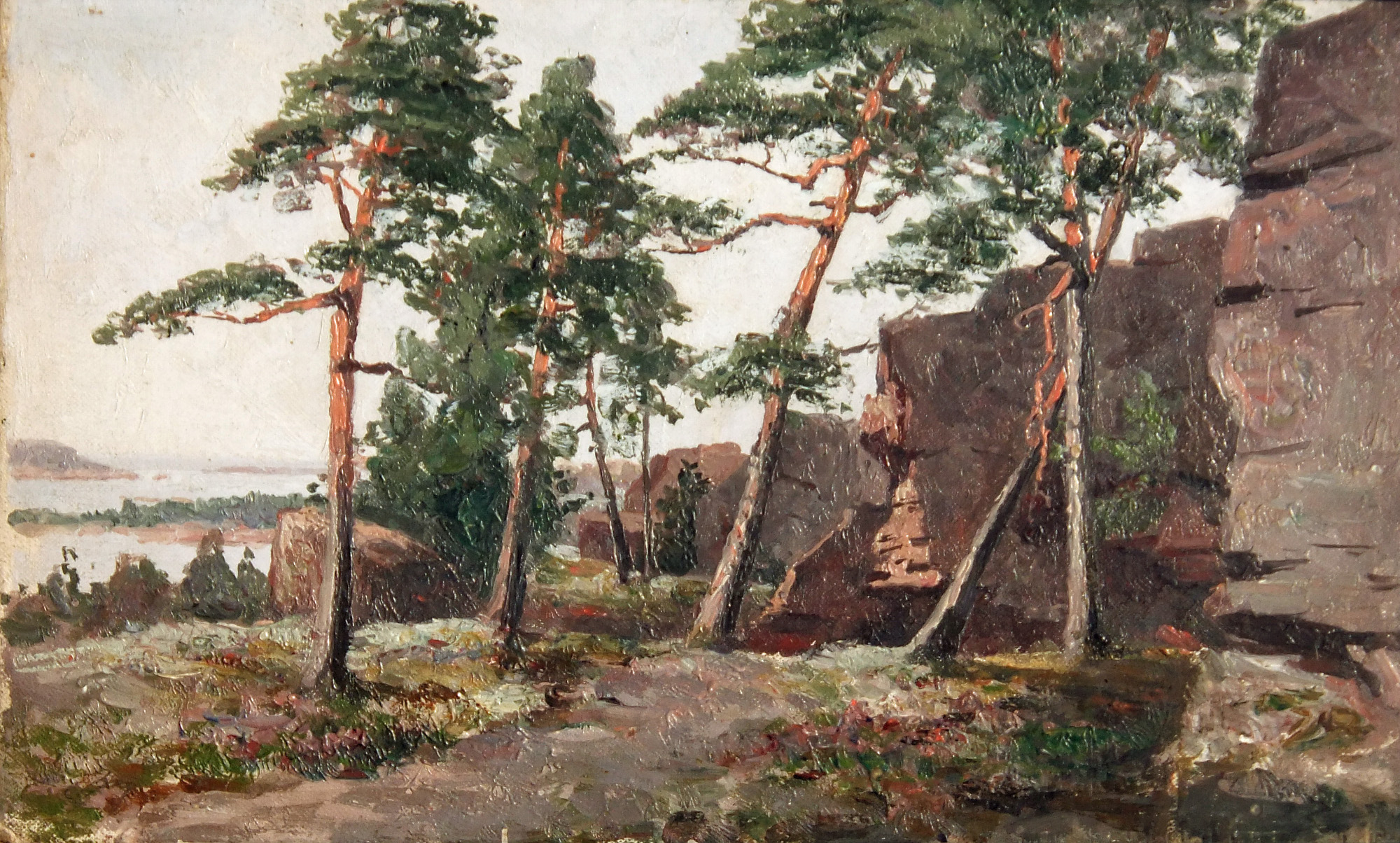
Geta Bergen, Ellen Favorin, 1899
