= Ahlstedt =

Ahlstedt is a surname. Notable people with this surname include:

- Börje Ahlstedt (born 1939), a Swedish actor
- Emmy Ahlstedt (born 1981), Swedish politician
- Douglas Ahlstedt (1945 – 2023), an American tenor singer
- Fredrik Ahlstedt (1839 – 1901), a Finnish landscape and portrait painter
- Fredrik Ahlstedt (politician) (born 1968), Swedish politician
- Ida Aalle-Teljo (born "Ida Ahlstedt"; 1875 – 1955), a Finnish politician
- Nina Ahlstedt (1853 – 1907), another Finnish painter
