= Favorin =

Favorin is a surname. Notable people with the surname include:

- Ellen Favorin (1853–1919), Swedish-speaking Finnish painter
- Yury Favorin (born 1986), Russian pianist

== See also ==
- Favorinus (80s–160s), Roman sophist and philosopher
