= Spärck =

Spärck is a German family name, and may refer to:

- Karen Spärck Jones (1935–2007), British computer and information scientist
- Ida Gisiko-Spärck (1859–1940), Swedish painter,
- Ragnar Spärck (1896–1965), Danish zoologist
  - Spärck used as an author citation in zoology

== See also ==
- Karen Spärck Jones Award
