= Edvard Westman =

Swedish painter

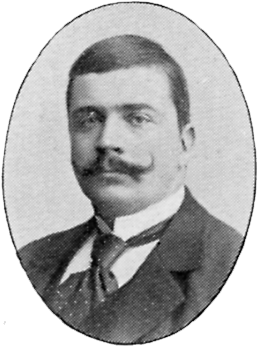
Edvard Westman (1901)

Gustav Edvard Westman (16 May 1865 – 23 September 1917) was a Swedish painter, known for his works in the plein air style.

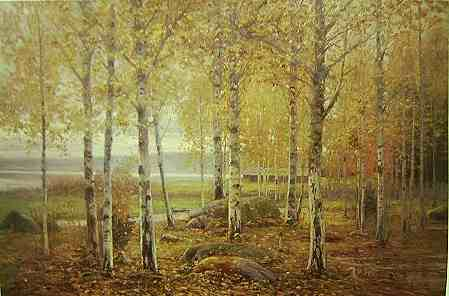
Strandlandskap (before 1917)

== Biography ==
Edvard Westman was born in Gävle, Sweden, but spent most of his childhood in Stockholm. He was the son of Johan Ludwig Westman and Emma Elisabeth Holmström. His brother Ernst Ludvig Westman (1863–1949) was also an artist. After first attending the Swedish Academy in Stockholm from 1882 to 1883, he was then a student with artist Oscar Törnå (c. 1842–1894) at his studio.

He continued his studies in the Düsseldorf Academy from 1883 to 1885 under Heinrich Lauenstein, followed by a period in Paris and Belgium. After his studies in Paris, he became a member of the artists colonies in Skagen, Denmark, and Önningeby on the island of Åland in the late 19th century. He spent several years in Turku, Finland, frequently returning to Åland where he joined Victor Westerholm (1860–1919) and his friends at the artists colony, which he first time visited in 1887.

In Önningeby village he met a Finnish painter Hanna Rönnberg. They secretly engaged, but never married. Afterwards he moved to Koholma in Sweden.

Westman participated in the Swedish Association of Artists (Konstnärsförbundet) exhibitions in Gothenburg and Stockholm in 1891. He exhibited at the World's Columbian Exposition at Chicago in 1893 and in the Industrial Exhibition at Lund in 1907.

Edvard Westman died in accident near his home in Norrtälje, Stockholm County, Sweden, in 1917.

His art consists principally of natural studies and landscape portraits made in oil or etching and frequently featuring Normandy, Åland and Skagen. His works are in the permanent collections of Skagen Museum and Önningebymuseet in Önningeby as well as at museums in Gävleborg and Turku.
