= Elin Alfhild Nordlund =

Finnish painter (1861–1941)

Elin Alfhild Isabella Nordlund
- Born: 1861; Närpes, Finland
- Died: 1941 (aged 79–80); Sauvo, Finland
- Known for: painter
- Movement: Realism

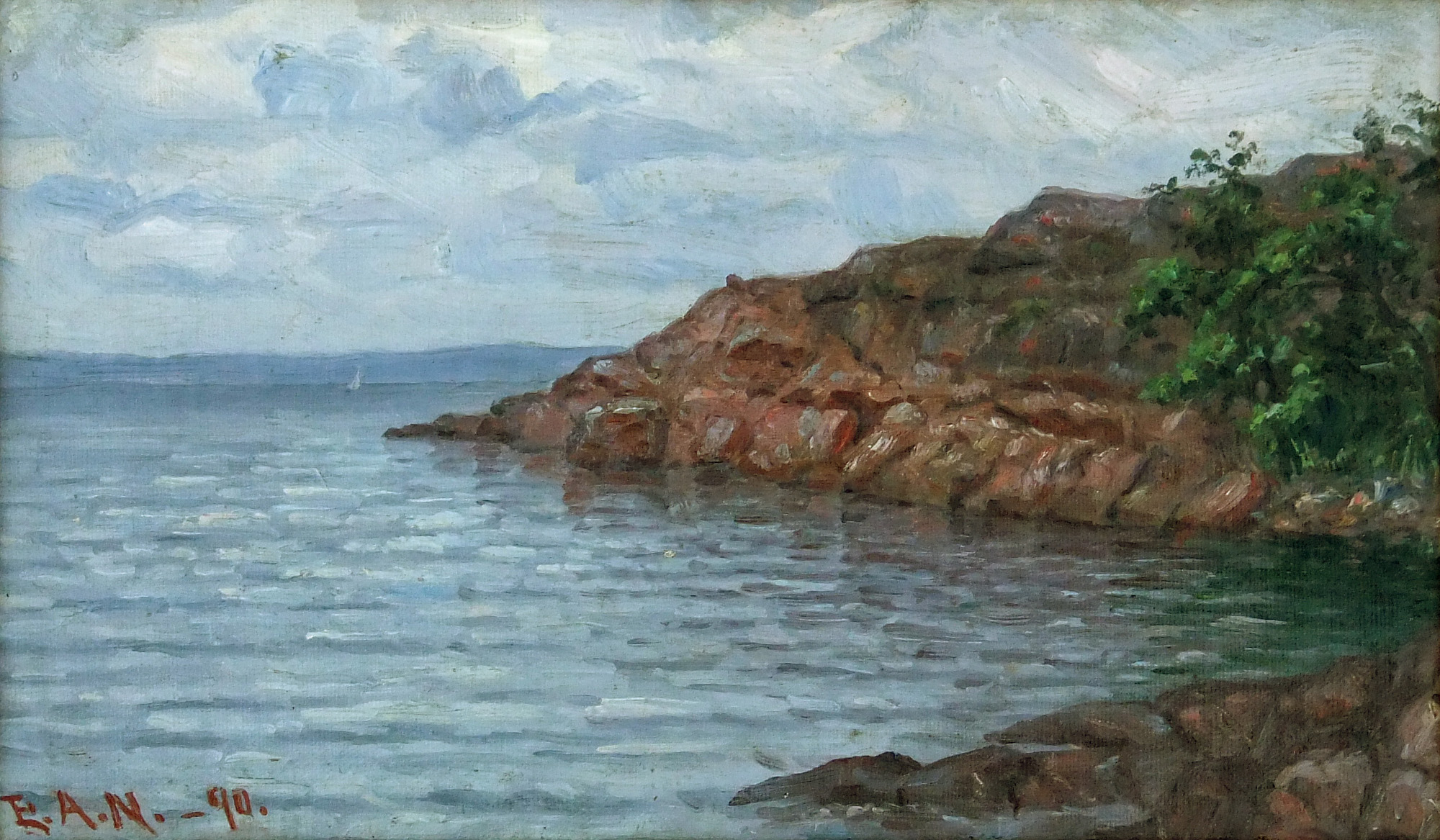
Elin Alfhild Nordlund: The Lumpbarn Sea (1890)

Elin Alfhild Isabella Nordlund (1861–1941) was a Swedish-speaking Finnish painter. She was one of the artists who joined Victor Westerholm in the artists colony at Önningeby on the island of Åland. Examples of her work are in the permanent collection in the Önningeby Museum and have also been exhibited in the Turku Art Museum and the National Gallery of Finland.

Because there is another Finnish painter named Elin Johanna Nordlund born in 1855, Elin Alfhild Nordlund used her middle name Alfhild, signing her works E. A. N.

== Biography ==
Elin first studied in Turku Drawing School in 1881-1884, and later drawing, painting and calligraphy with Adolf von Becker in Helsinki. In 1887-88 she continued in Copenhagen with Peder Severin Krøyer and Julius Paulsen, where she also studied wood cutting, and subsequently offering cutting classes and the theory of perspective (graphical). She also spent some time in Paris.

In 1889 Elin got a position of drawing teacher at Heurlinska School and subsequently in two lyceums in Helsinki.

She arrived to Önningeby probably in 1887, which is unclear, as it is unclear whether she came back the next year. However, it is well-established that Elin stayed at the colony in 1889 and 1890. Subsequently she often visited the Åland Islands in 1900s, at least three times, in 1904, 1906 and 1911.

== Gallery ==
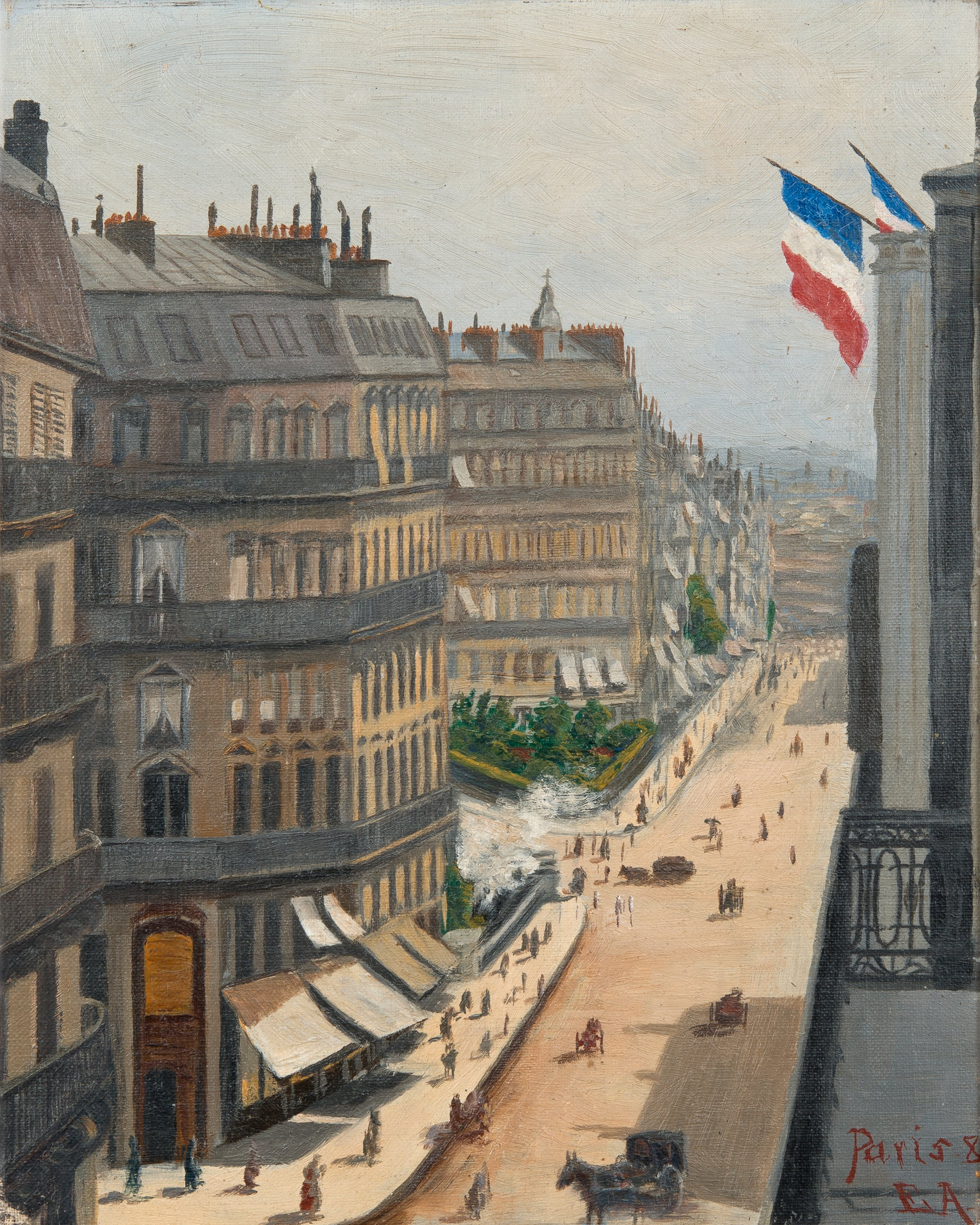
Street View from Paris, 1889

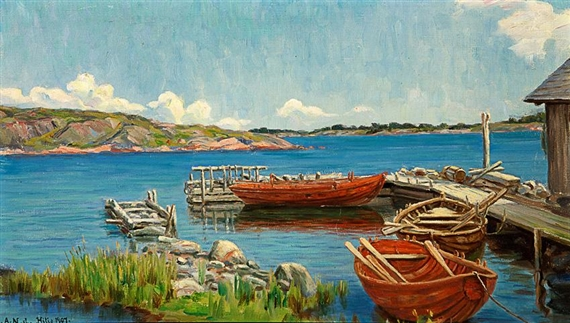
Hitis, 1907

=== List of paintings ===
- Landscape in Önningeby, Främsnabba by Lumparn, 1890
- Coastal Landscape in Kimito
- Marine Landscape, 1906
- Portrait of a Woman
- Birch Pasture
- Summer Berries
- Shore Landscape
