= Hanna Rönnberg =

Finnish painter (1862–1946)

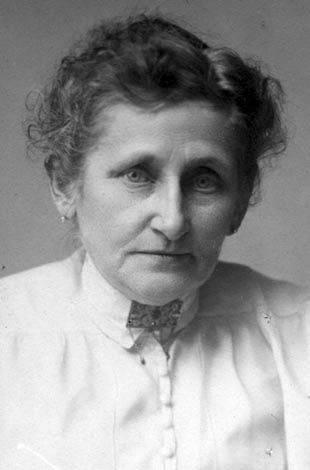
- Born: Johanna Sofia Rönnberg; 16 April 1862; Hämeenlinna, Grand Duchy of Finland
- Died: 9 October 1946 (aged 84); Helsinki, Finland
- Known for: Painter
- Movement: Realism

Johanna (Hanna) Sofia Rönnberg (16 April 1862 – 9 October 1946) was a Finnish artist and writer. She belonged to the generation of women painters in the 1880s who adopted the French Realism style, becoming an active member of the Önningeby artists colony on the island of Åland. As an author, she is remembered mainly for her depictions of Scandinavian artists at the end of the 19th century.

== Biography ==
Born on 16 April 1862 in Hämeenlinna, Rönnberg was the daughter of Johan Rönnberg and Evelin Sofie Stenvall. She studied at the Finnish Art Society's Drawing School (1875–81) in Helsinki and at the Royal Swedish Academy of Fine Arts (1881–85) in Stockholm. She went on to attend courses in Paris at the Académie Julian and the Académie Colarossi.

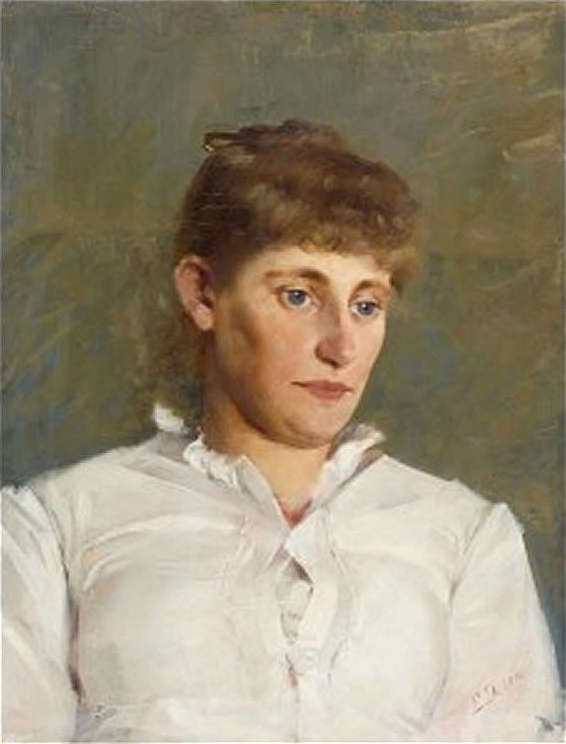
Portrait by Elin Danielson-Gambogi

She became particularly attached to the artists colony at Önningeby where the painter Victor Westerholm had a summer house. One of the most important members of the group, she first visited in 1886. Although she was not initially impressed by the place, she changed her mind afterwards and returned year after year. She contributed to the colony's success by including it in her fictional and non-fictional writings. One of the members of the colony was Elin Danielson, with whom she painted both in Önningeby and in Paris.

In 1888, Edvard Westman invited her to join him in Denmark. They met in Copenhagen and together visited the Danish artists colony in Skagen. The couple was engaged secretly, and for a time they planned to marry, but never did.

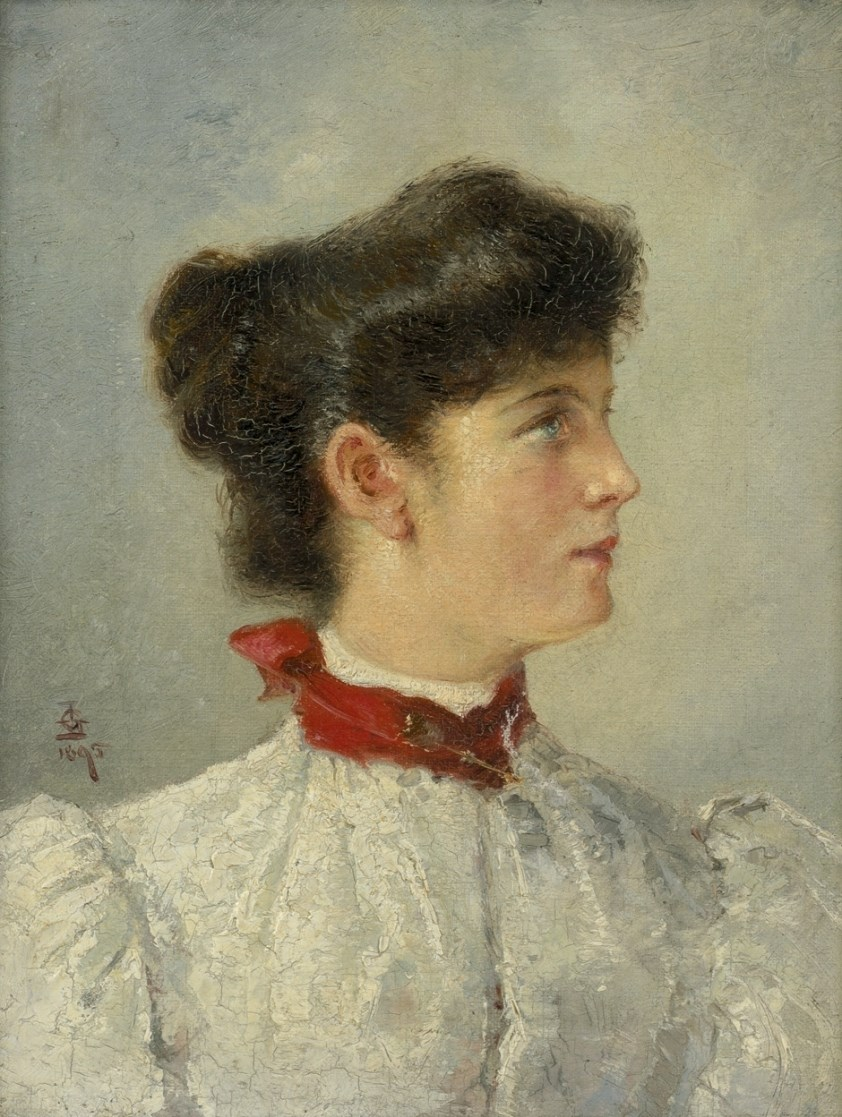
Portrait by Ida Gisiko-Spärck, 1895

Her paintings often included people. Her best works appeared around 1890, some achieving success at exhibitions. Her early works of outdoor scenes on Åland were inspired by the French en plein air movement. She continued to paint in the 1890s and even later, introducing brighter colour and sweeping brushstrokes. In 1932, she arranged a solo exhibition of the paintings.

She became interested in the lives of the inhabitants of the Åland Islands, including them in her fiction and non-fiction writings. Already from 1880s she started writing articles for newspapers. From the early 1890s, she concentrated increasingly on her short story collections including Från Ålands skär - sägner och historier (1899) and Brovaktens historier (1905), which received a Swedish literature award in 1905. In 1938, she published an account of the artist colony in Konstnärskolonien på Äland 1886–1914.

In 1910, Hanna Rönnberg moved and spent her later years in a villa on the coast in Kulosaari just outside Helsinki with a housekeeper Linda Ekholm, where she died on 9 October 1946.

== Works ==
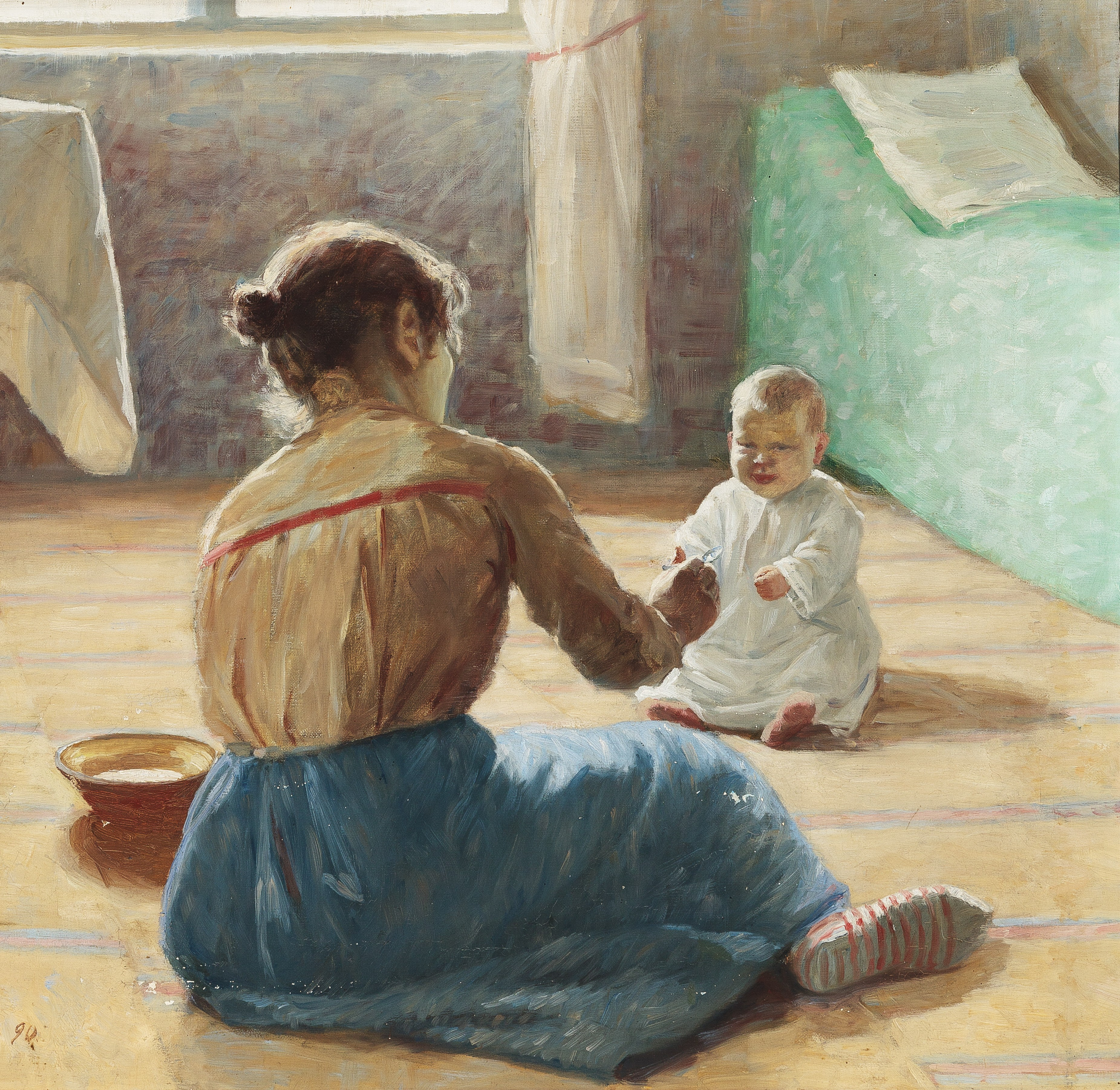
Mother and Child, 1890

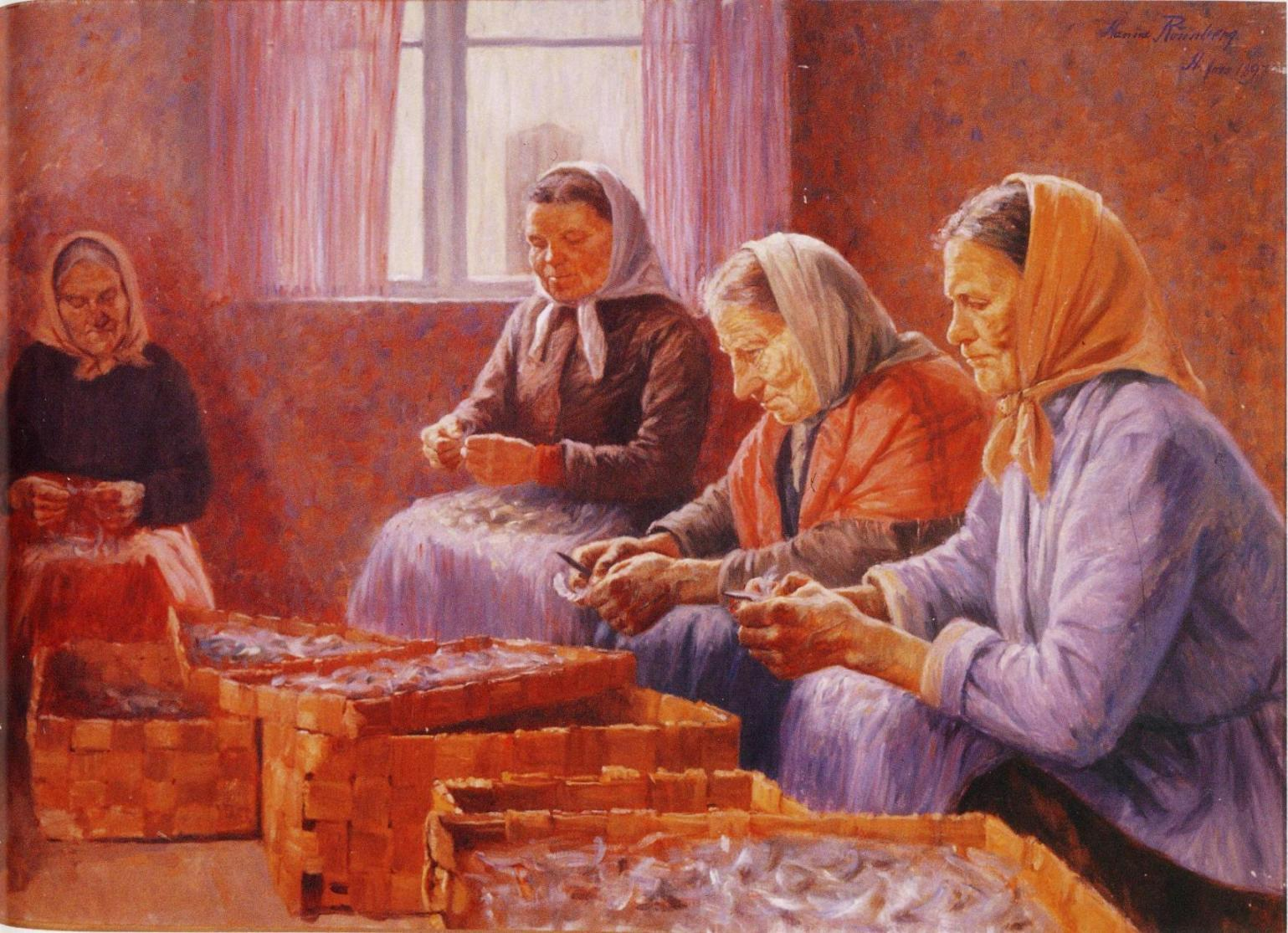
At the Workhouse, 1893

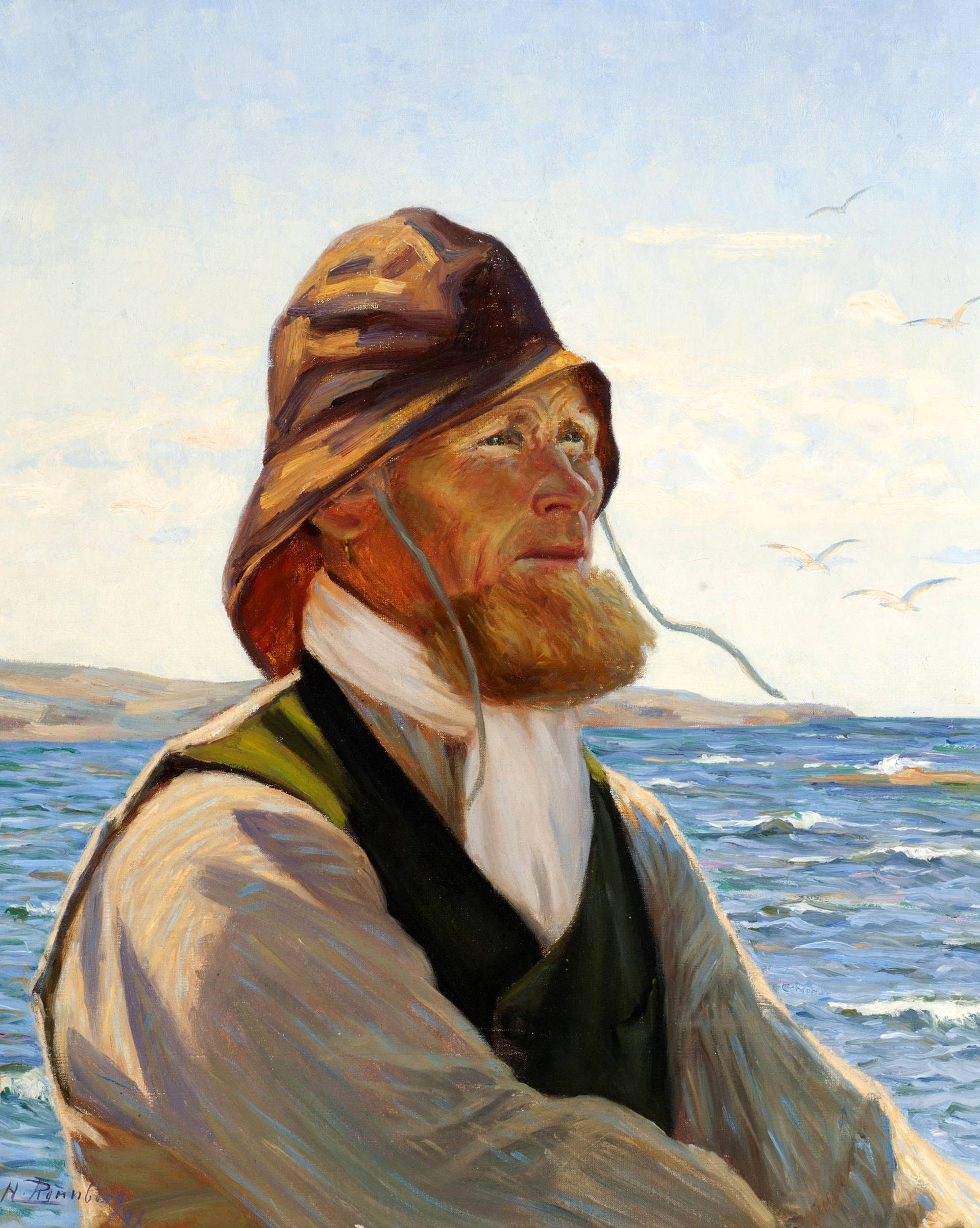
Fisherman from Åland, 1897

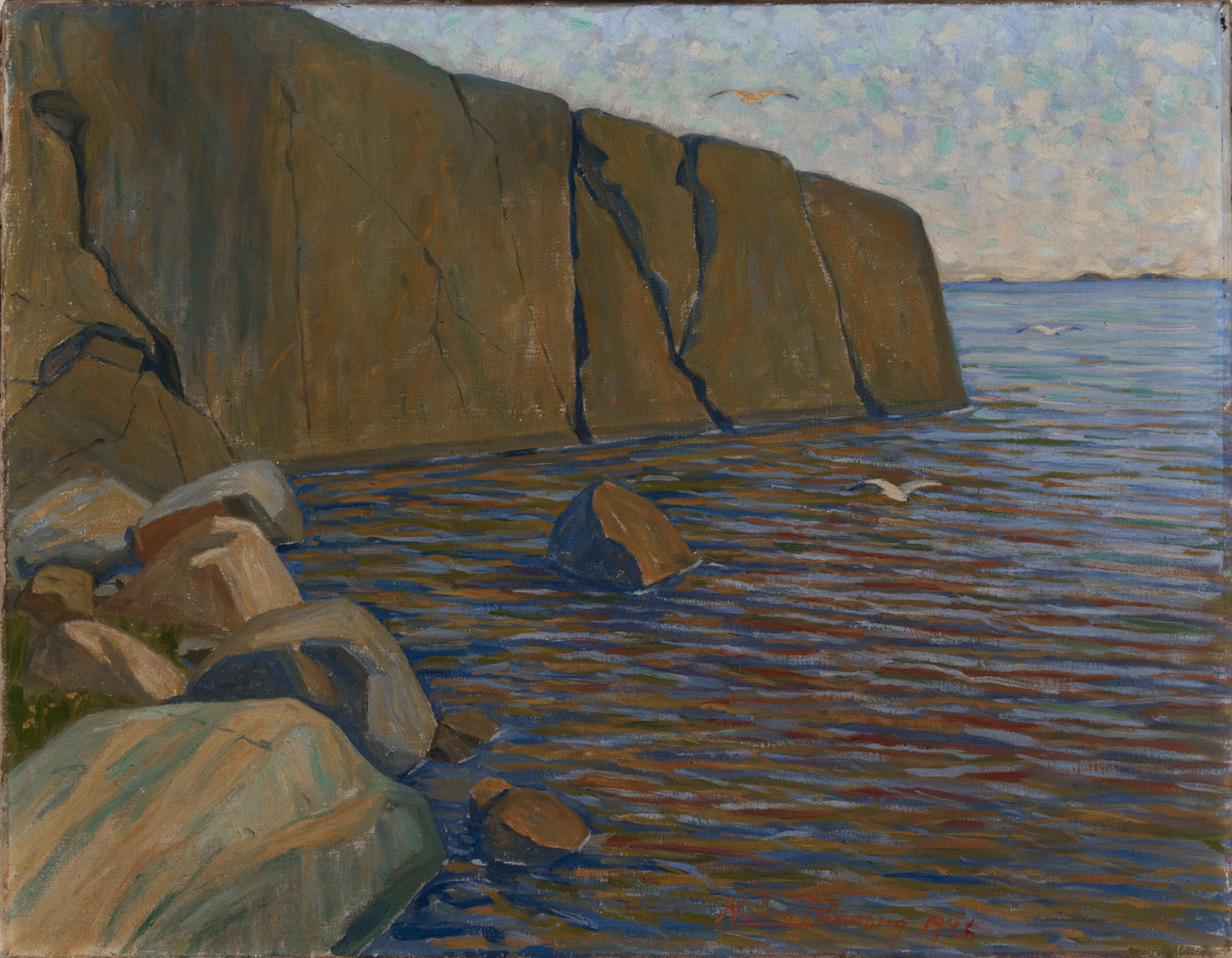
Rocky Shore Cliffs, 1926

== See also ==
- Golden Age of Finnish Art
- Finnish art
