= Helmi Sjöstrand =

Finnish painter (1864–1957)

Helmi Gunhild Sjöstrand
- Born: 1864
- Died: 1957

Helmi Gunhild Sjöstrand (1864–1957) was a Swedish-speaking Finnish painter. The daughter of the Swedish sculptor Carl Eneas Sjöstrand, she spent much of her life in Sweden. She was one of the artists who joined Victor Westerholm in the artists colony at Önningeby on the island of Åland. While there, she painted several portraits of Elin Danielson and J.A.G. Acke.
