= Fredrik Ahlstedt =

Finnish painter

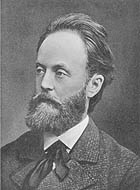
- Born: August Fredrik Ahlstedt; 24 April 1839; Turku, Grand Duchy of Finland, Russian Empire (now Finland)
- Died: 19 August 1901 (aged 62); Pargas, Grand Duchy of Finland, Russian Empire (now Finland)
- Known for: Painting

August Fredrik Ahlstedt (24 April 1839 Turku – 19 August 1901 Pargas) was a Finnish landscape and portrait painter.

== Biography ==
Born in Turku, he studied under Robert Wilhelm Ekman before continuing his studies in Düsseldorf (1869–74). He was one of the first artists to join Victor Westerholm in the artists colony at Önningeby on the island of Åland in 1886. He and his wife Nina Ahlstedt, also a painter, returned there in subsequent years.

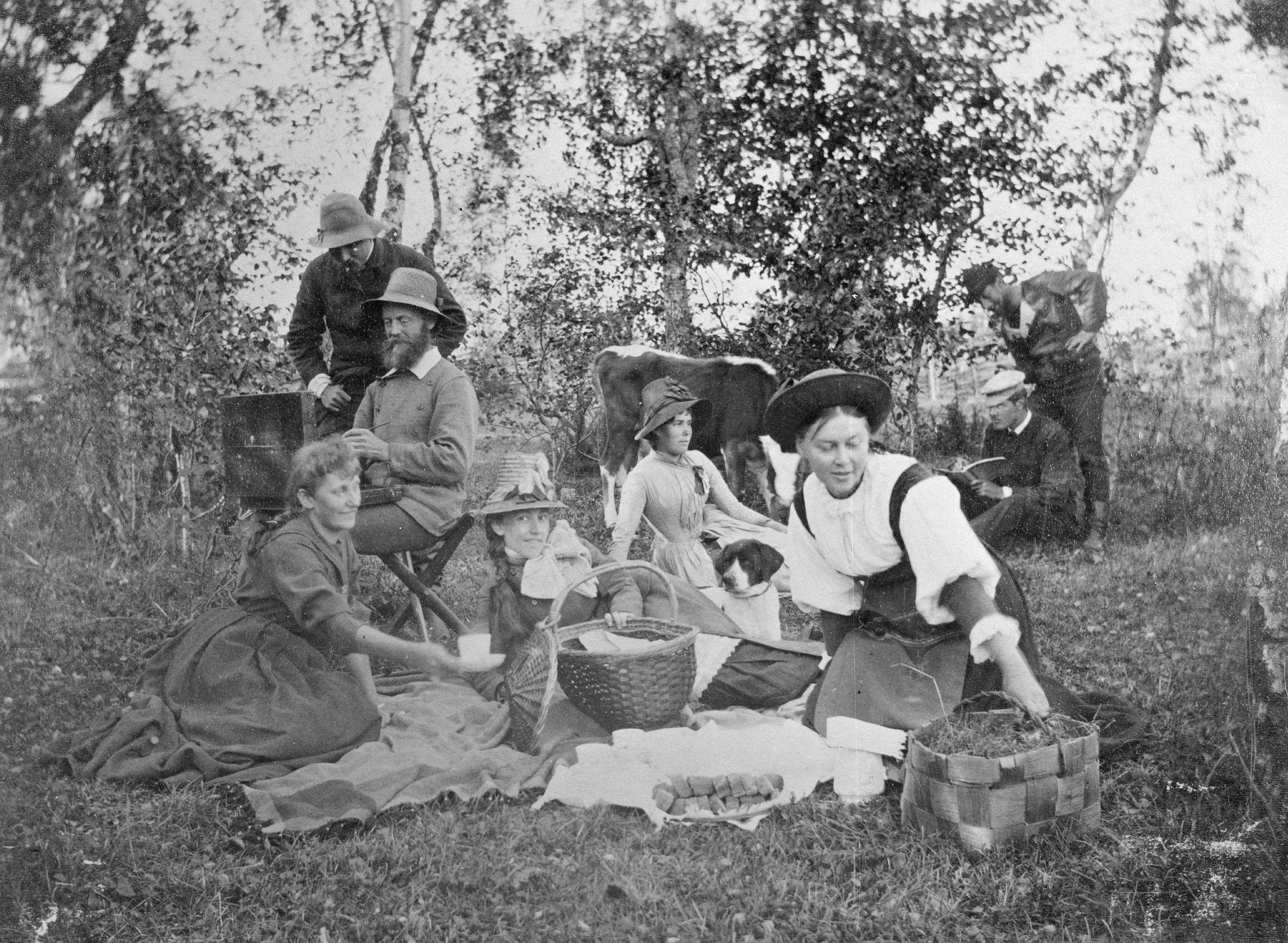
Sitting in the chair at Önningebykolonin in 1886, with his wife Nina front right

Ahlstedt was a prolific painter, creating a wide range of portraits and landscapes. His work is part of permanent collections in Finland and abroad. He participated in exhibitions at the Finnish Artists Exhibitions from 1892 to 1901, as well as in Stockholm (1897) and Paris (1900). A posthumous exhibition was held at the Finnish Artists Exhibition in 1924.

== Works ==
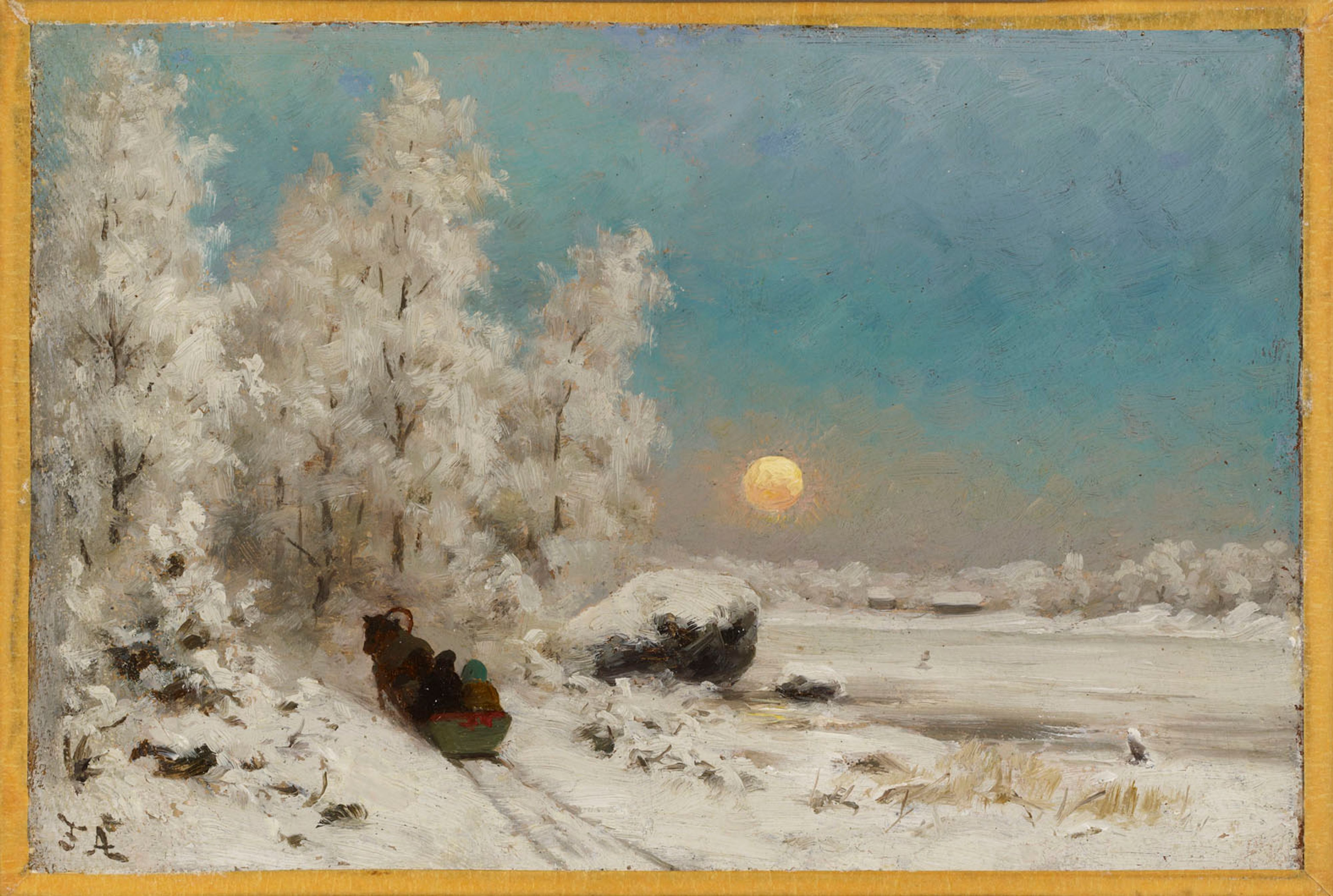
Winter Night, Moon Rising, unknown date

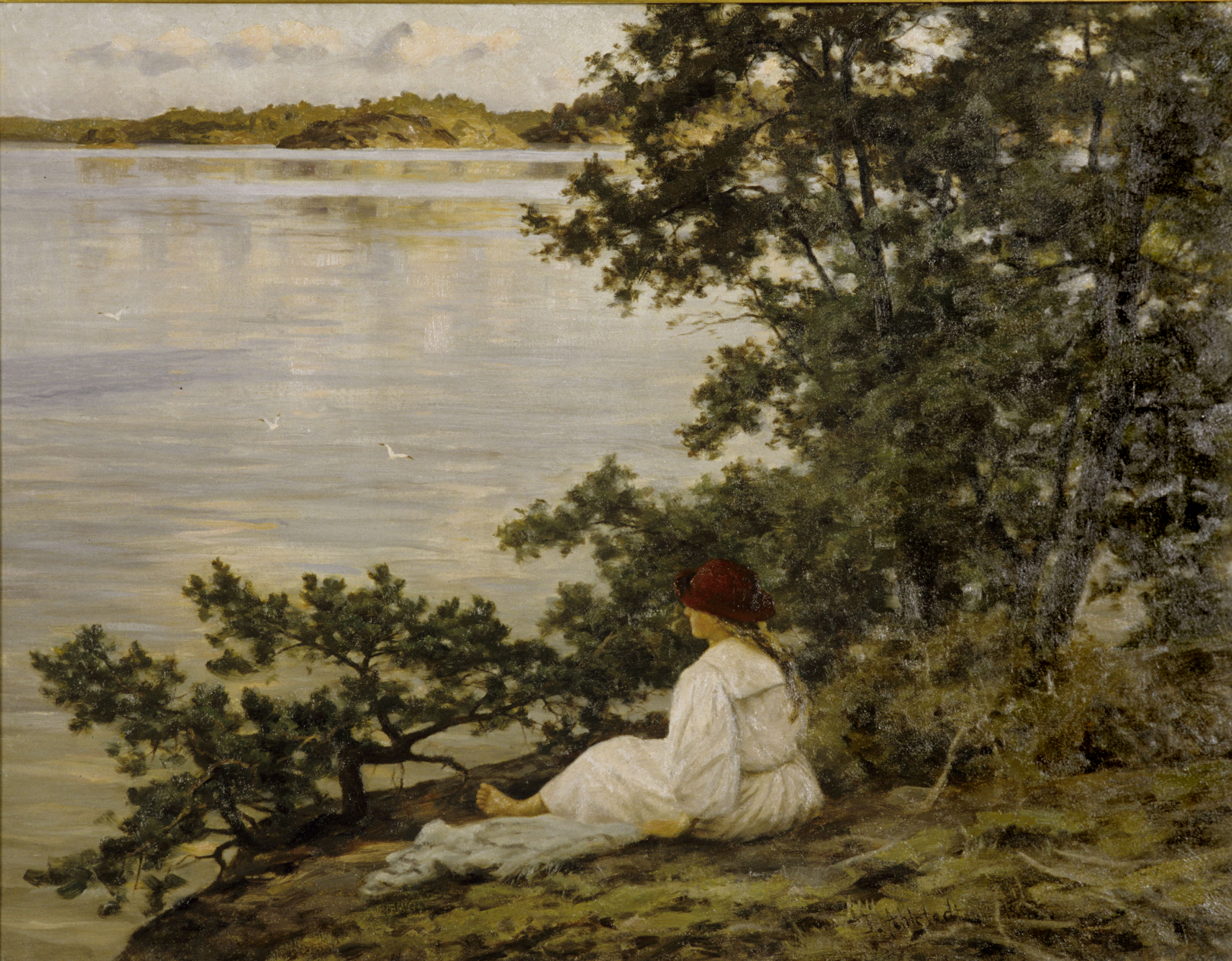
It Is Oh So Quiet, 1896

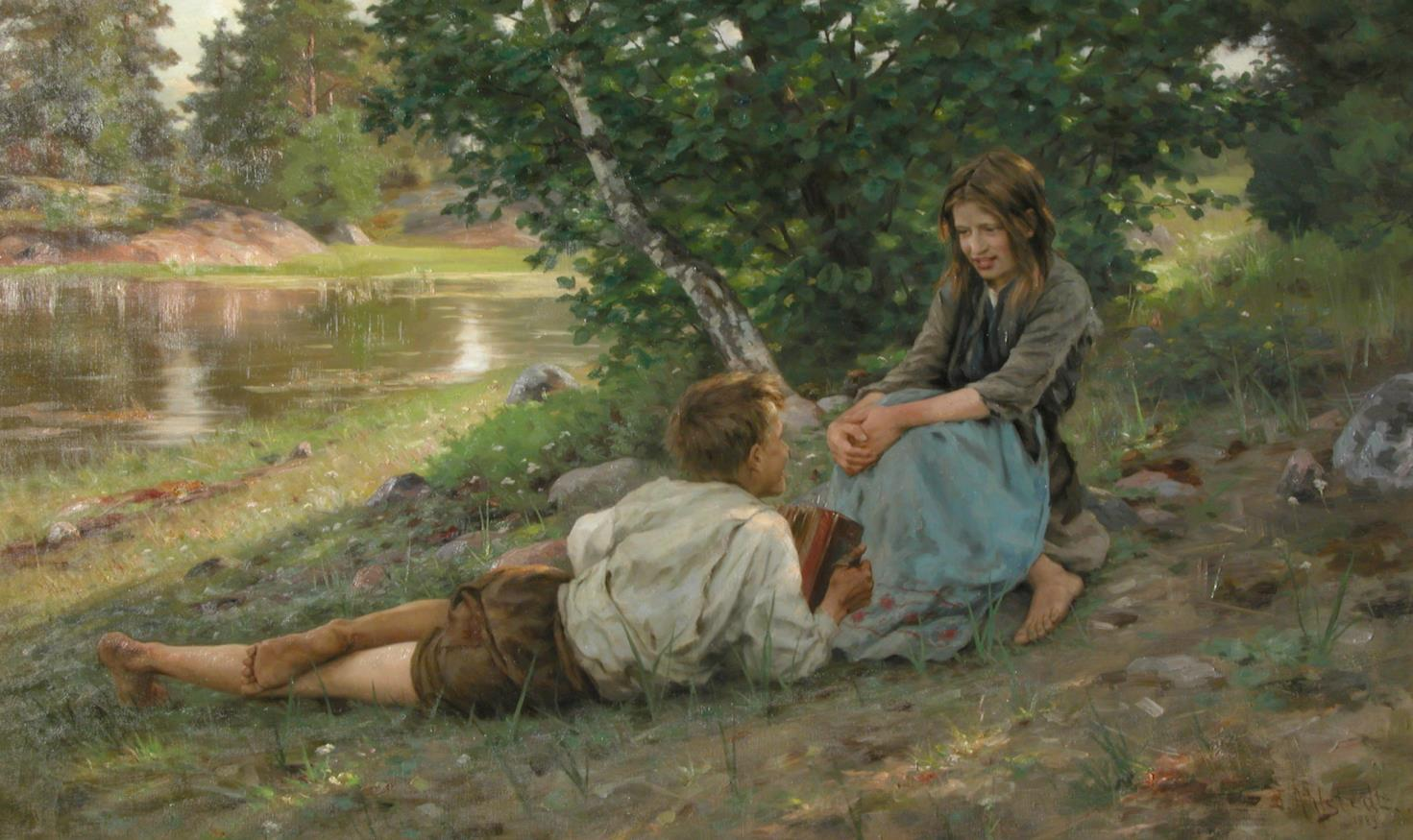
Landscape, 1889

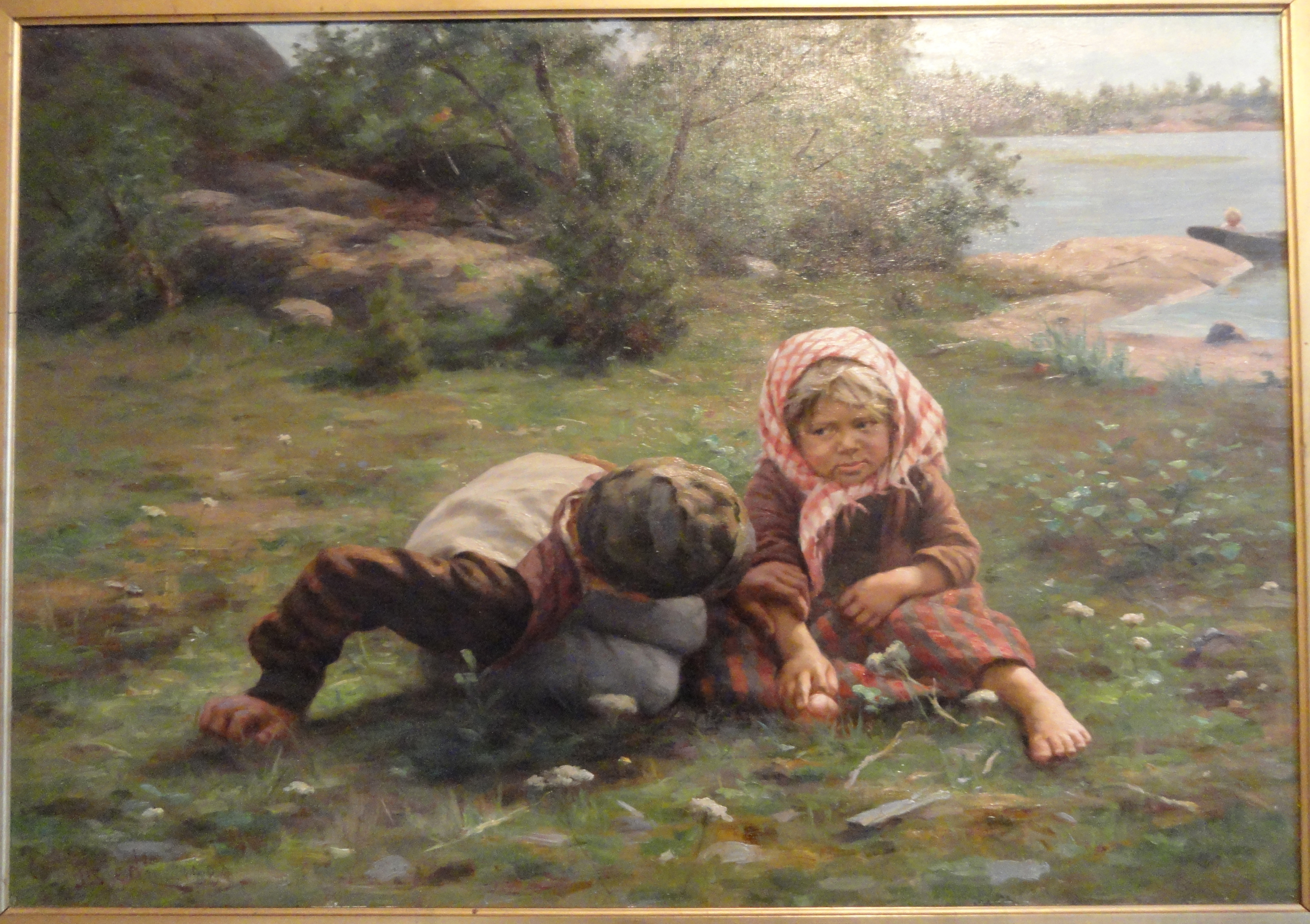
A Little Bit Out of Humor, 1889

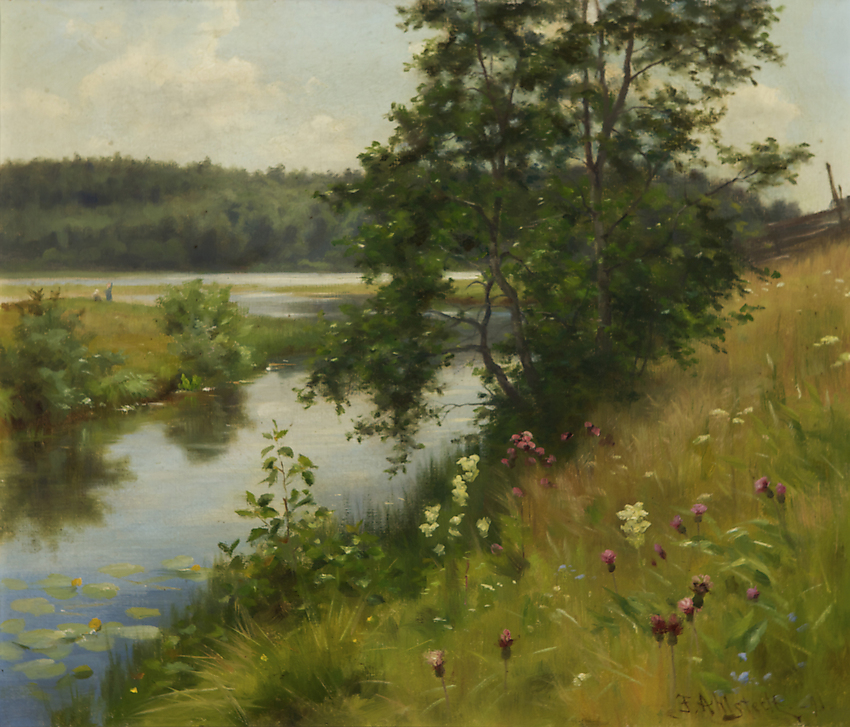
Summer Landscape, 1891

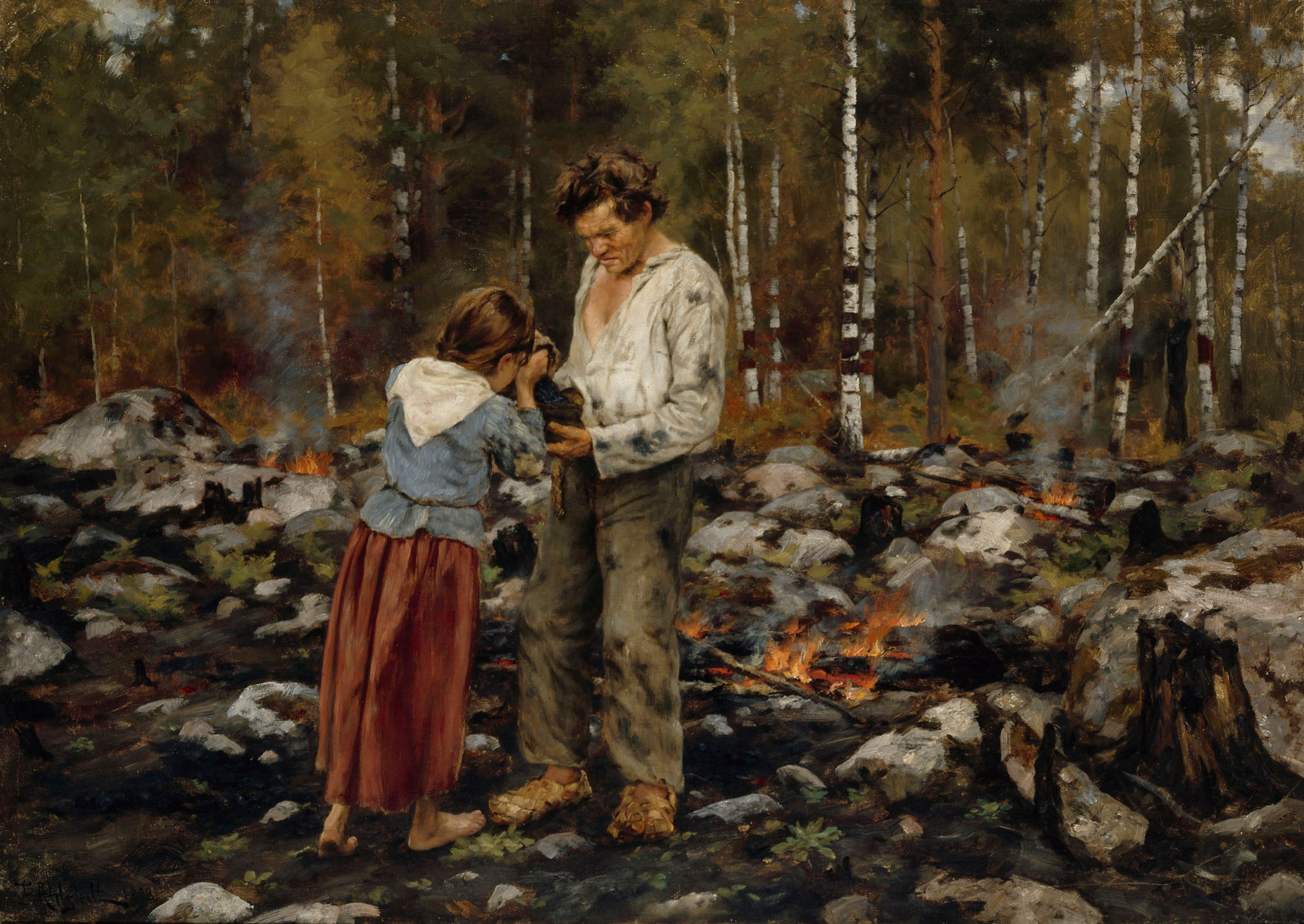
Matti Burning the Brushwood, 1893

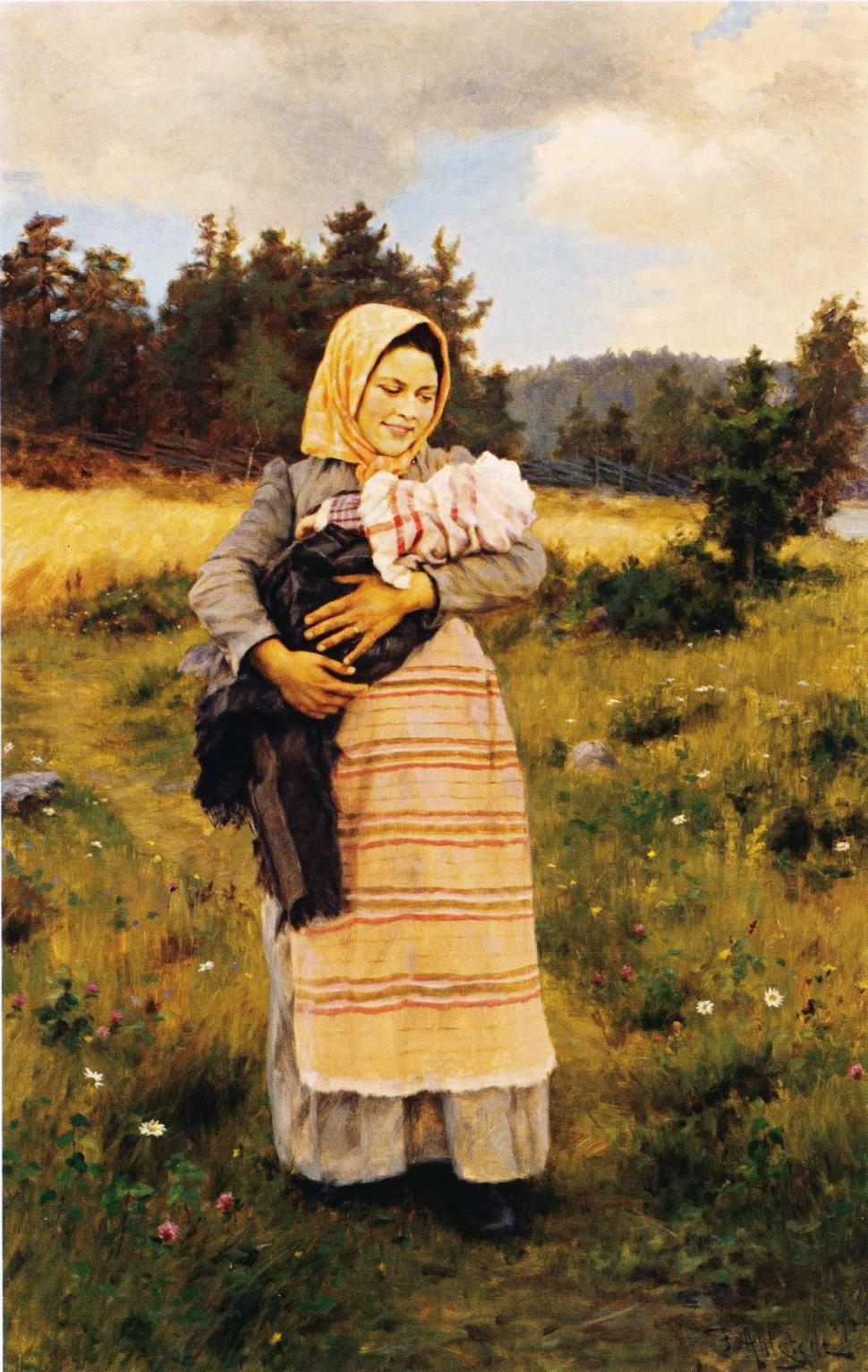
Young Mother, 1893

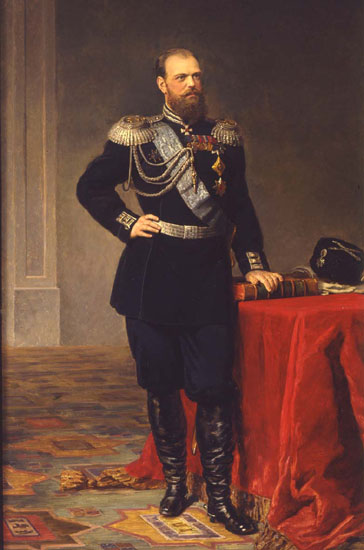
Portrait of Alexander III, 1897

== See also ==
- Finnish art
