= Nina Ahlstedt =

Finnish painter

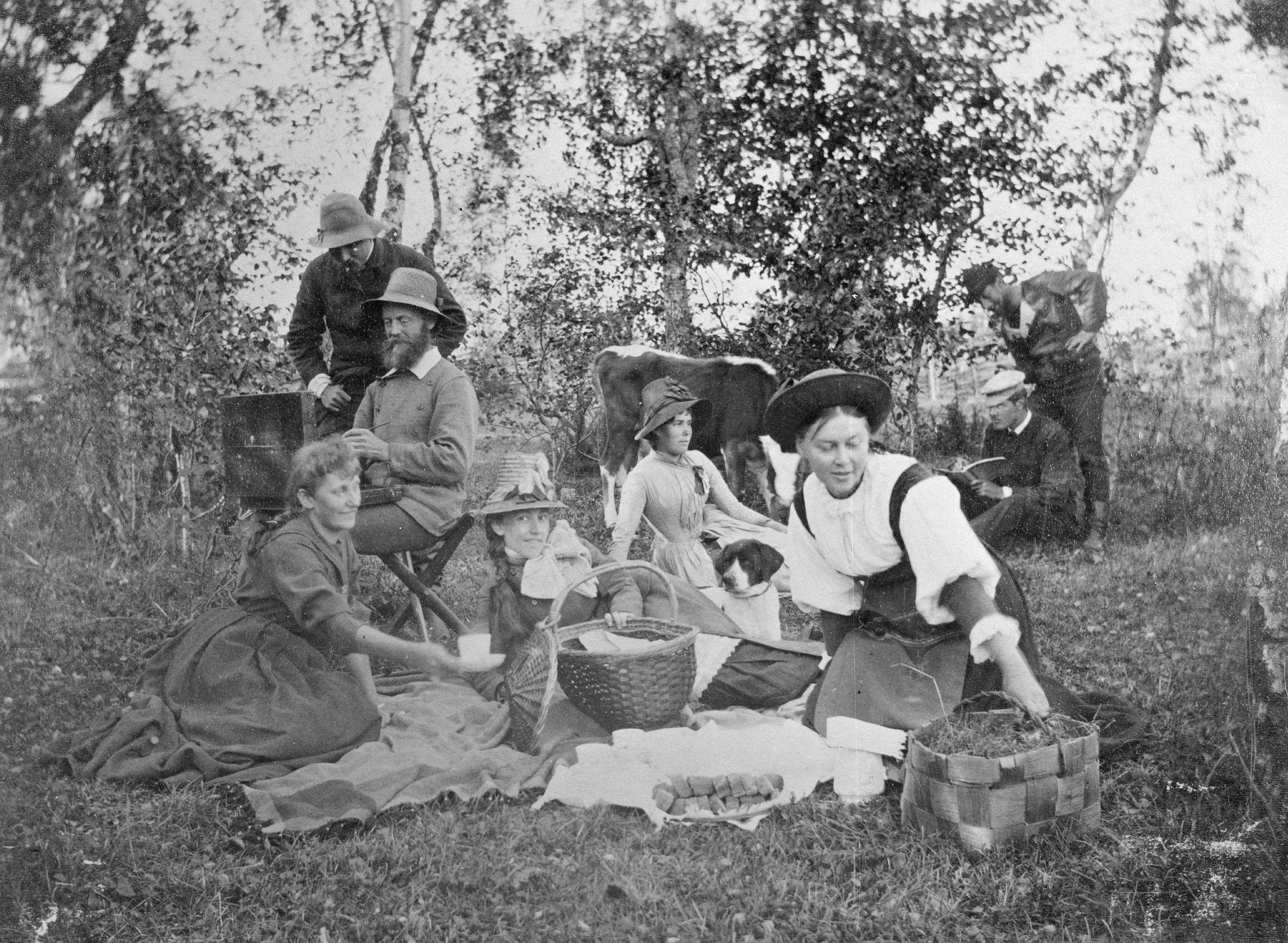
Nina Ahlstedt front right as a participant to the Önningeby artists colony in the summer of 1886

Nina Ahlstedt née Lingell (1853–1907) was a Finnish painter (belonging to Swedish-speaking population of Finland).

== Biography ==
She studied at the art school in Turku (1871–1876) and at the Académie Colarossi in Paris (1880–81 and again in 1897). After a début in 1878, she presented her work at the Finnish Artists Exhibitions in 1892, 1894–1899, 1902 and 1904. Ahlstedt was one of the first artists to join Victor Westerholm in the artists colony at Önningeby on the island of Åland in 1886. She and her husband Fredrik Ahlstedt, also a painter, returned there in subsequent years.

== Gallery ==
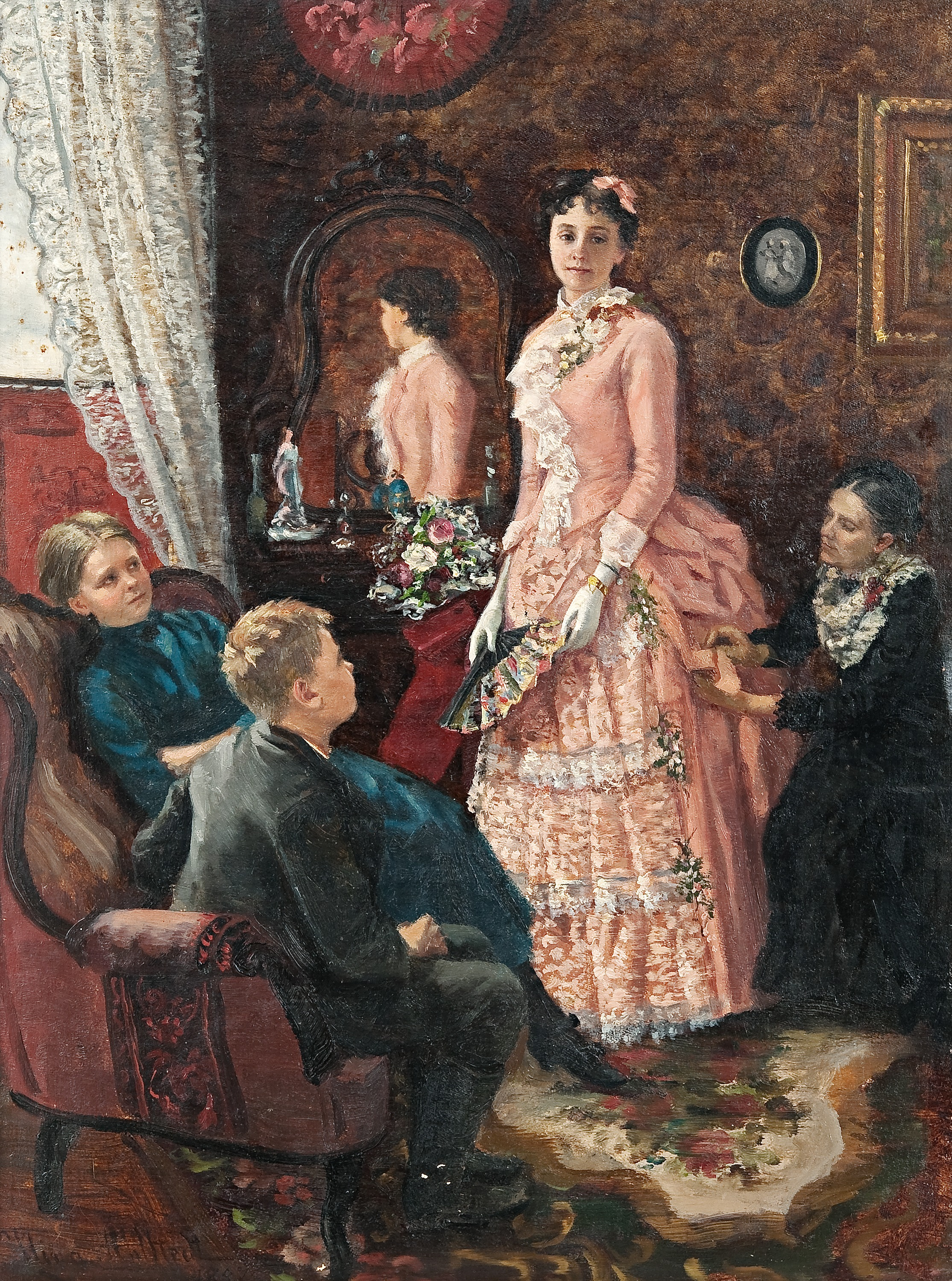
Lady in a Pink Dress, 1887

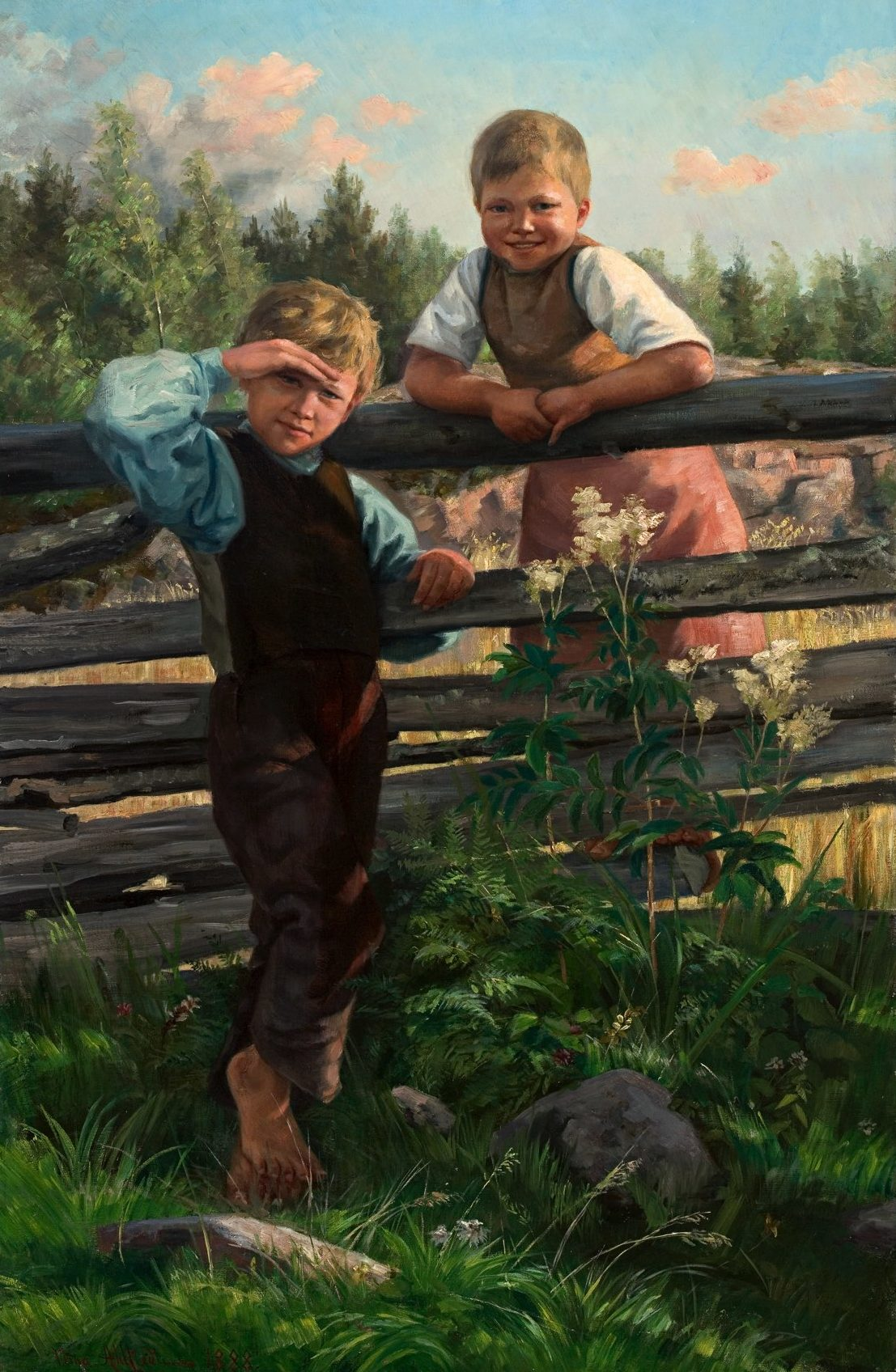
Roadside, 1888

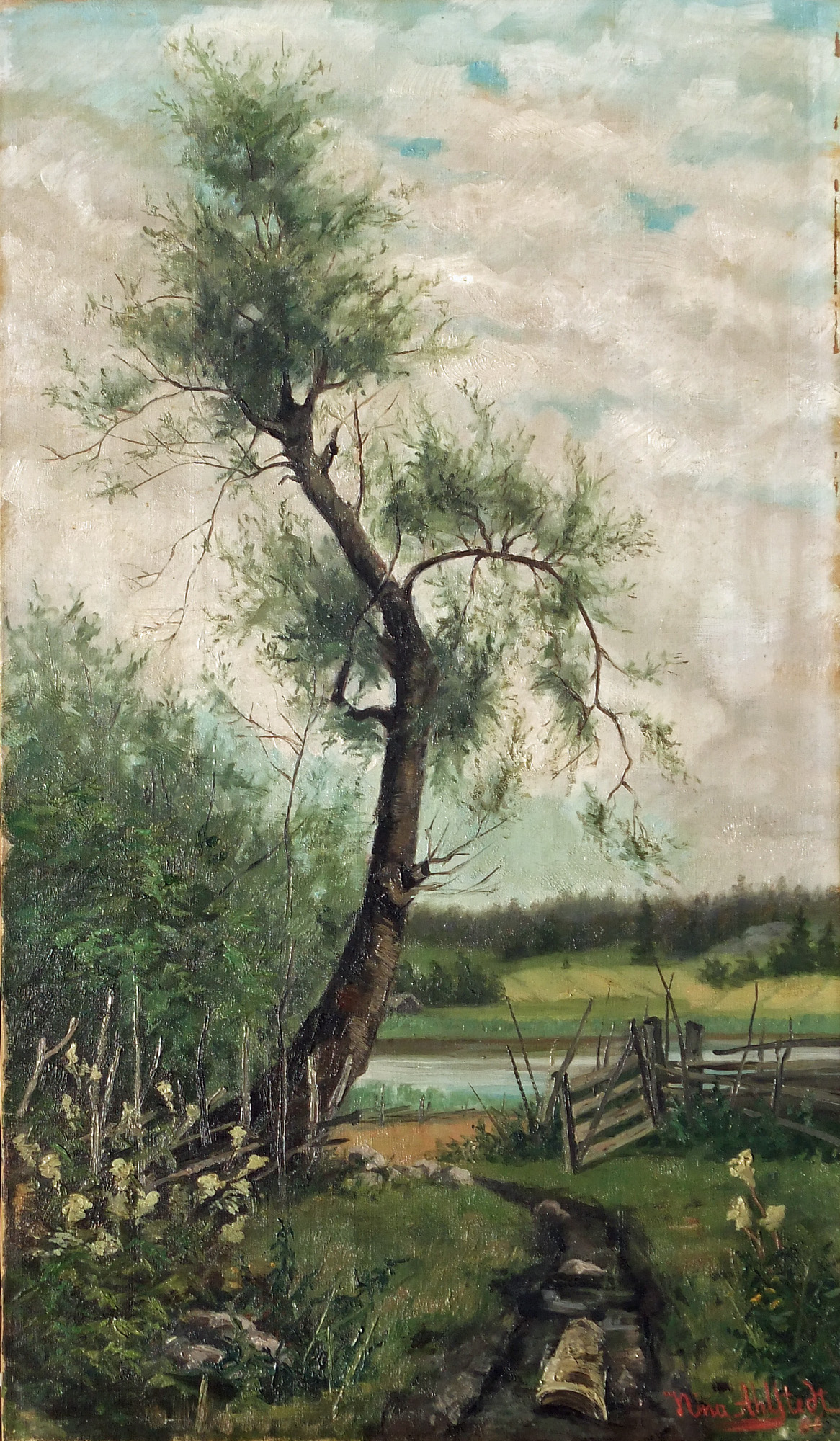
The Gate (Grinden), 1896
