= Ida Gisiko-Spärck =

Swedish painter

Ida Emma Charlotta Gisiko-Spärck
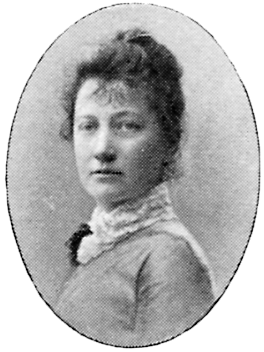
- Ida Gisiko-Spärck (1901)
- Born: Ida Emma Charlotta Gisiko; 1859; Stockholm, Sweden
- Died: 1940 (aged 80–81)
- Education: Swedish Academy
- Known for: Painter
- Movement: Realism

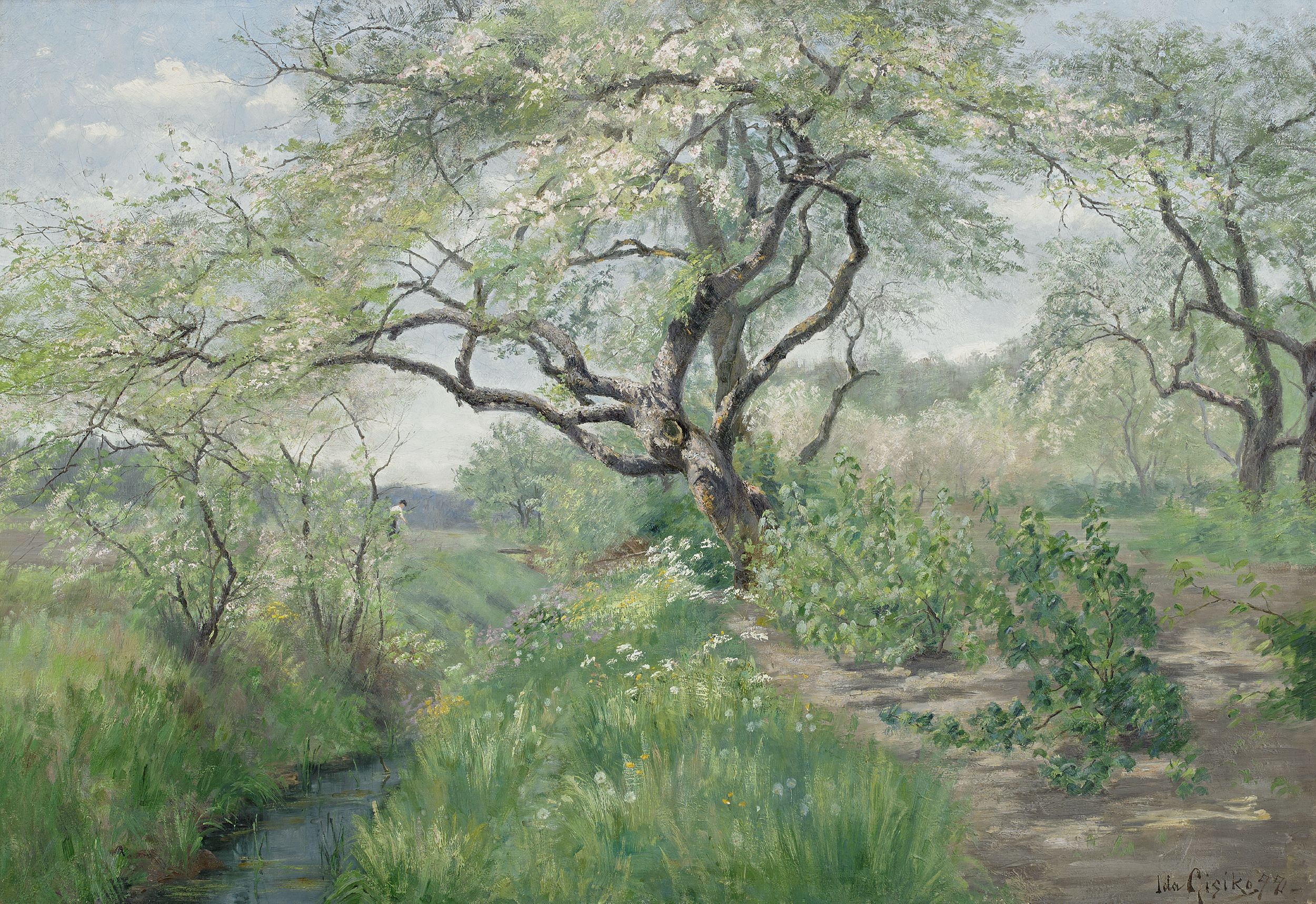
Ida Gisiko-Spärck: "Summer Landscape" (1892)

Ida Emma Charlotta Gisiko-Spärck (1859–1940) was a Swedish painter, who became a member of the Önningeby artists colony on Åland. She is remembered for her landscapes in oils.

== Biography ==
Born on 18 November 1859 in Stockholm, Ida Gisiko was the daughter of the wholesale merchant Karl Samuel Gisiko and Emma Loviisa Wetterling. Her brother Carl Edvard was married to Ida Björck, the sister of the Swedish artist Oscar Björck.

She enrolled at the Swedish Academy in Stockholm in 1882 and finished in 1887. During her studies in 1886, Ida took part in an excursion under Per Daniel Holm to Kungsör. At the academy, she met Finnish artist Hanna Rönnberg and became close friends with her. She studied in Paris at the end of the 1890s (1880s, according to another source), painting there together with Hanna too. Also, through their friendship, she went to Önningeby village on Ålands, where she joined the artists colony. She probably arrived in Önningeby in 1888, 1890 (or 1892), and was accommodated in the Jonesas farm's southwestern room.

Her paintings were first exhibited at the Southern Sweden Art Society in 1887, and afterwards in 1889, 1890, and 1896. In 1891, some of her works were exhibited at the Valand School of Art in Gothenburg. In 1890, she joined the Swedish Artists' Association.

In 1894, she married the Danish administrator Johan Albert Spärck (1840–1903) and moved to Denmark. Their son, Ragnar Spärk, was born in 1896, and became a zoologist. She died in 1940.

== Style and Works ==
Ida Gisiko painted landscapes with oil on canvas, especially sea shores and countryside. She painted in Sweden, Ålands, and Denmark. From her Parisian period, the most well-known work is A Street in Paris (1899). List of paintings:

- Summer in Archipelago, date unknown
- Cabbage Plot, 1890
- Fruit Trees in Bloom, date unknown
- Waves Against the Shore. Skagen, 1893
- The Village Street, 1895
- Skagen Dunes, date unknown
- Waiting on the Shore, 1899
- The Red Cottage, 1909
- A Country Road, date unknown
- Coastal Landscape, date unknown
