= Leo Belmonte =

Swedish painter (1875–1956)

Leo Belmonte with The First Sin under construction, c. 1938.

Leo Abraham Abendana Belmonte (30 October 1875 – 9 October 1956) was a Swedish painter and tapestry artist.

== Early life and family ==
Leo Belmonte was born in Stockholm, Sweden, on 30 October 1875, the son of the banker Isaac Belmonte. He had a brother James and sisters Helen, Anka, and Fanny. He studied in Sweden and at the Académie Julian in Paris, where he knew Sándor Nagy and met Percyval Tudor-Hart. He married Marguerite and they had a son Daniel and a daughter Yvette.

== Career ==
Belmonte trained in haute-lisse (high warp) tapestry techniques at the Gobelins Manufactory in Paris, and exhibited textiles and paintings at the St. Louis World's Fair in 1904. In 1905, he moved to the Gödöllő artists colony in Hungary and won two gold medals when works from Gödöllő were exhibited at the Milan International exhibition of 1906. He returned to France in 1914 and wove using designs by Percyval Tudor-Hart, Edmund Dulac, and Jules Chéret.

== Death ==
Belmonte died in Paris in 1956.
