= Ellen Favorin =

Finnish painter (1853–1919)

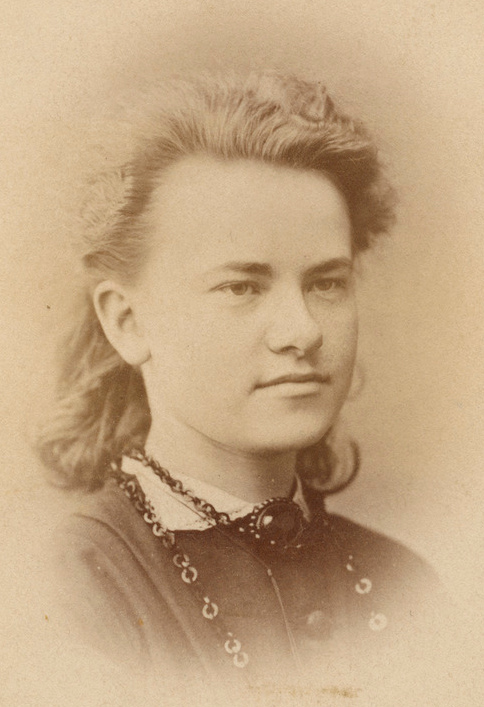
- Favorin in 1870s or 1880s
- Born: Elsa Favorin; 31 December 1853; Kuorevesi, Grand Duchy of Finland, Russian Empire (now Finland)
- Died: 27 November 1919 (aged 65); Lohja, Finland
- Known for: Painting

Elsa "Ellen" Favorin (31 December 1853 Kuorevesi – 27 November 1919 Lohja) was a Swedish-speaking Finnish painter.

== Biography ==
Her parents were Anders Abraham Favorin and Lovisa Ingman. After attending the painting schools in Helsinki and Stockholm, she continued her studies in Munich, Düsseldorf and at the Académie Julian in Paris. She often painted landscapes and was one of the artists who joined Victor Westerholm in the artists' colony at Önningeby on the island of Åland. She died together with her sister in a fire at their home in Lohja in 1919.

== Works ==
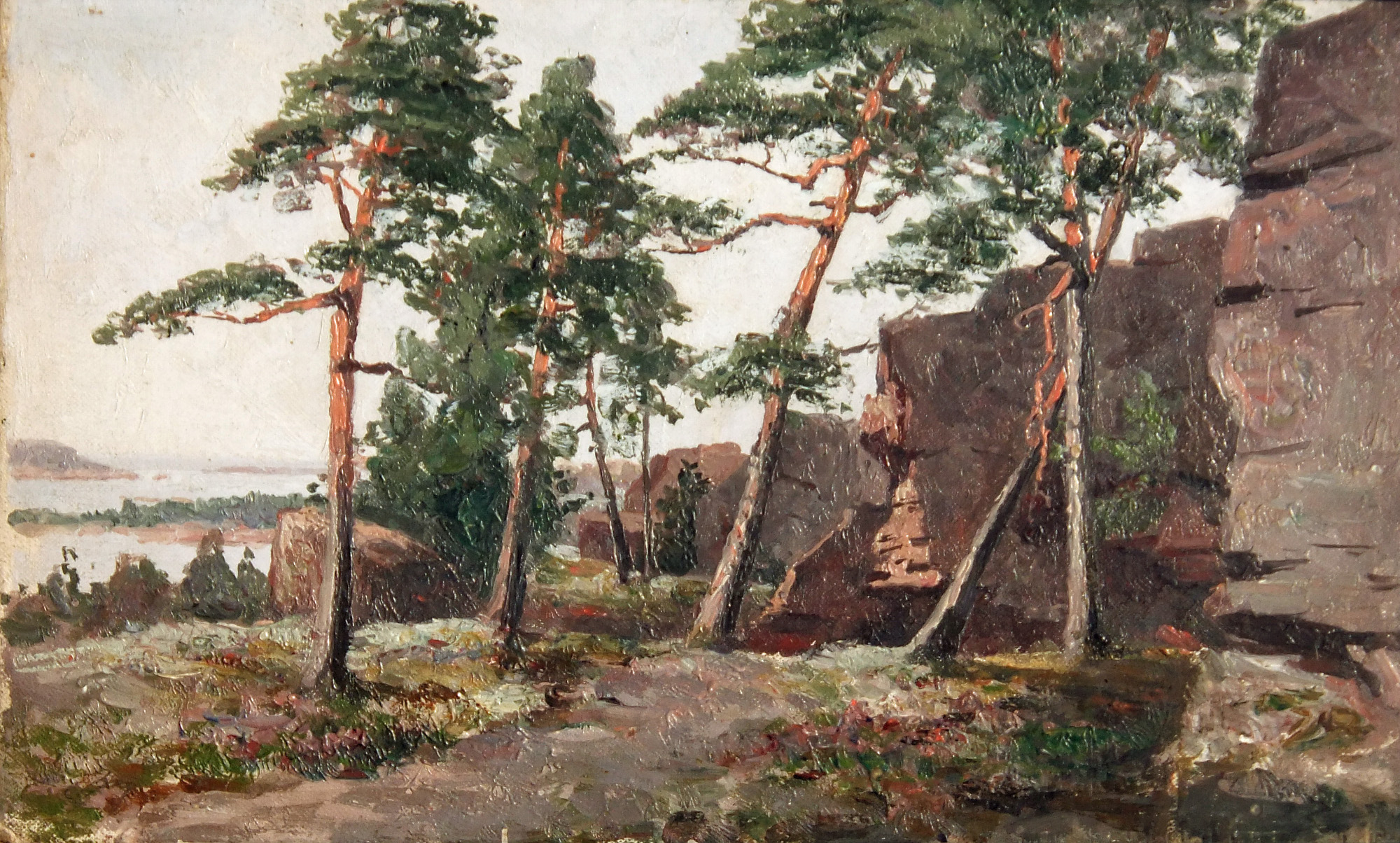
Geta Hill, 1899

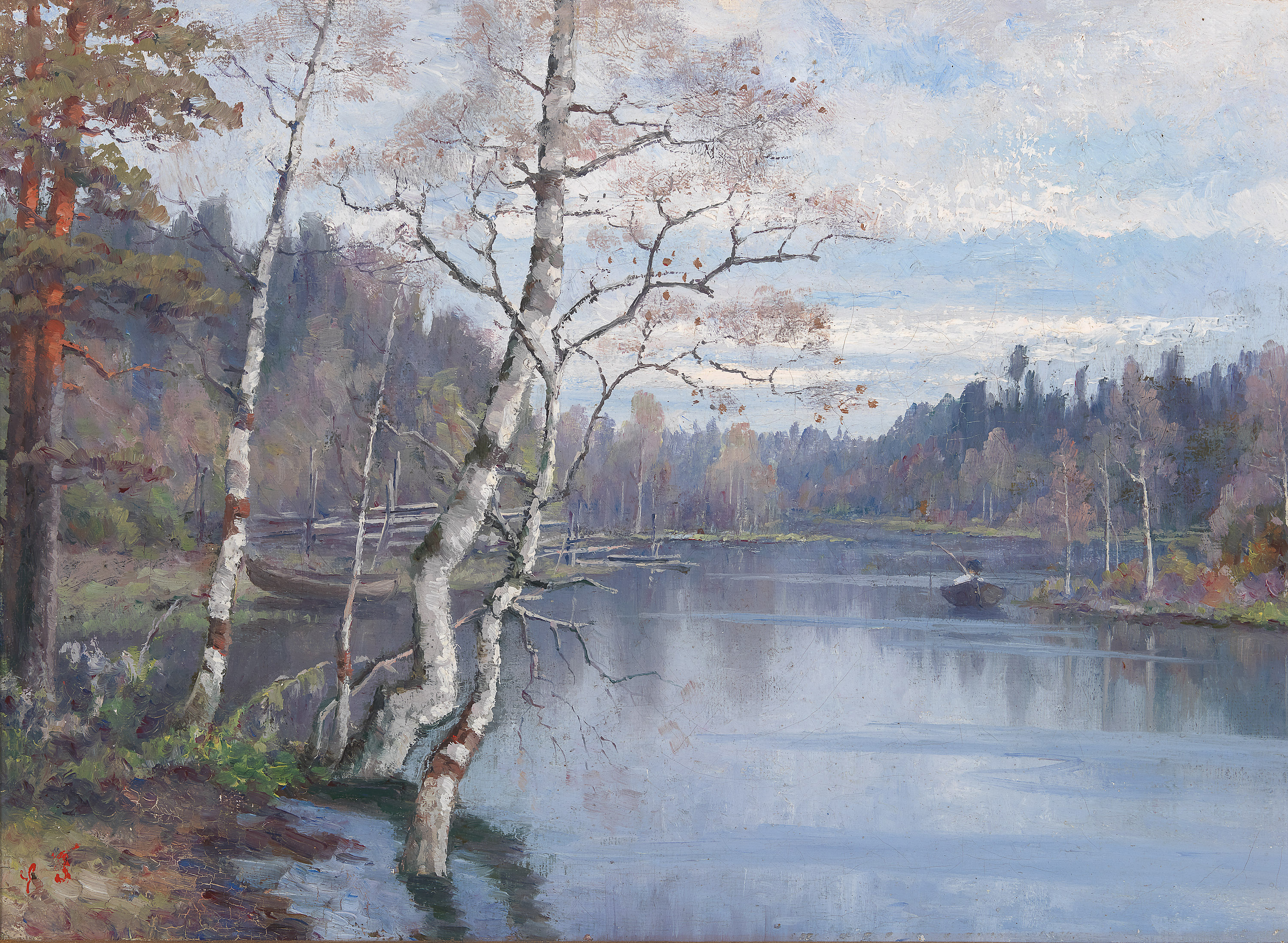
Spring Landscape, c. 1900

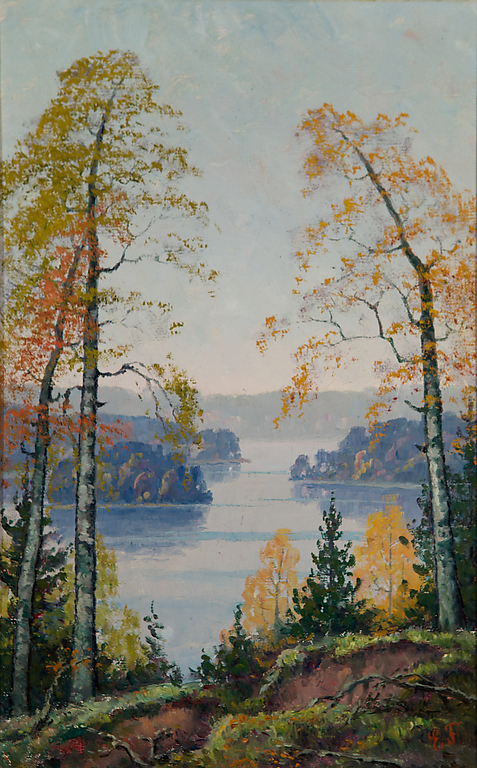
Lake Scene

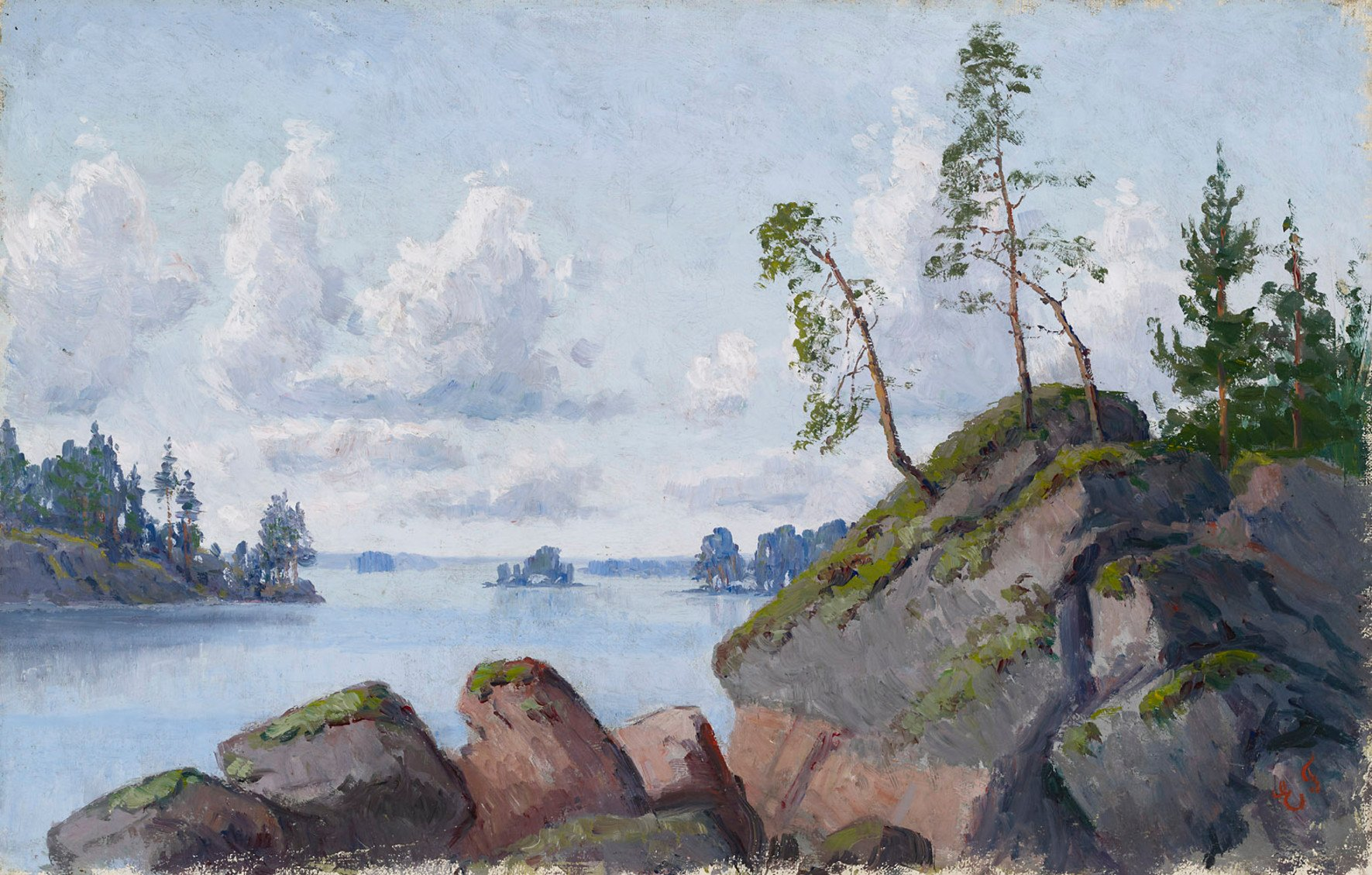
Strandscape

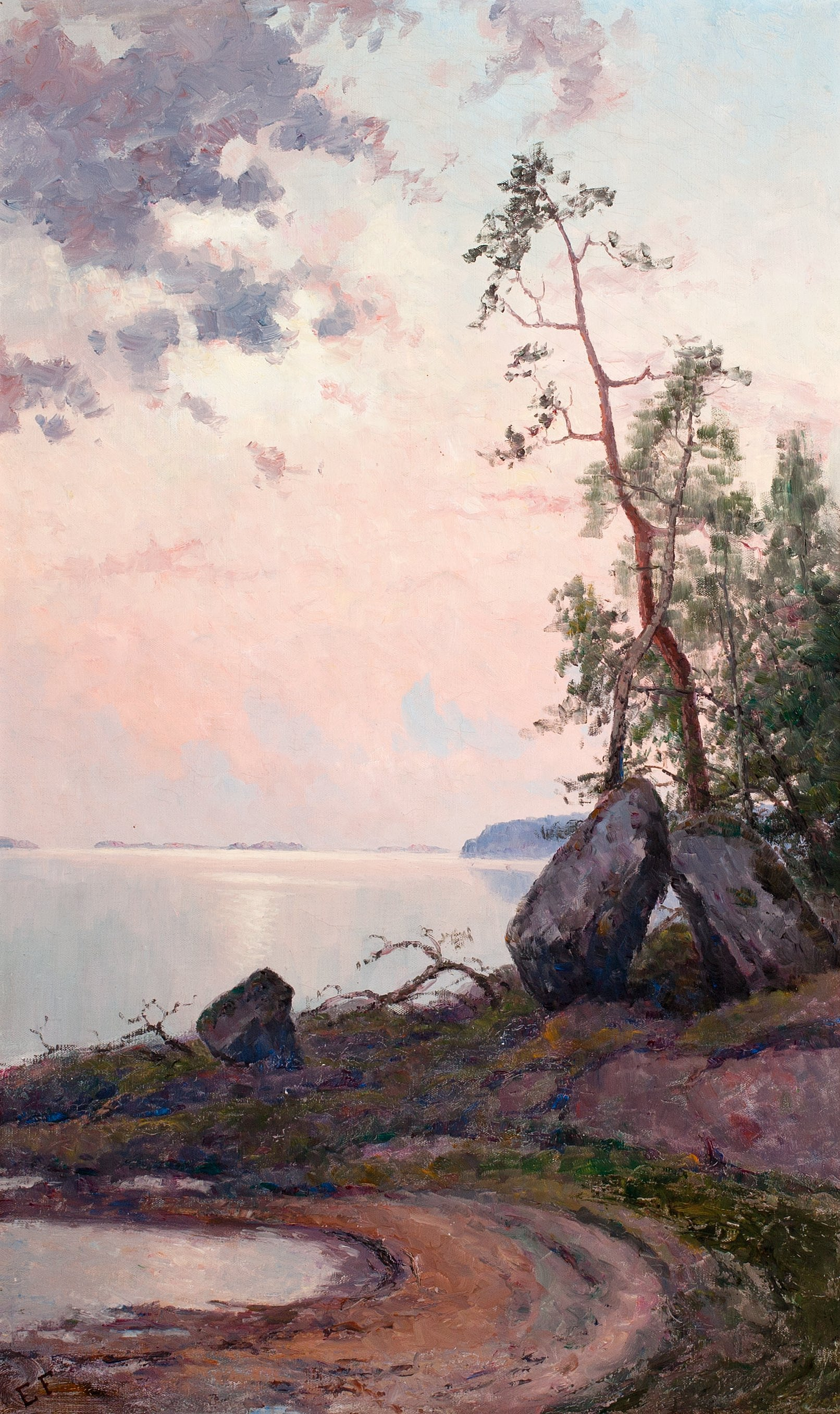
Lake Scene

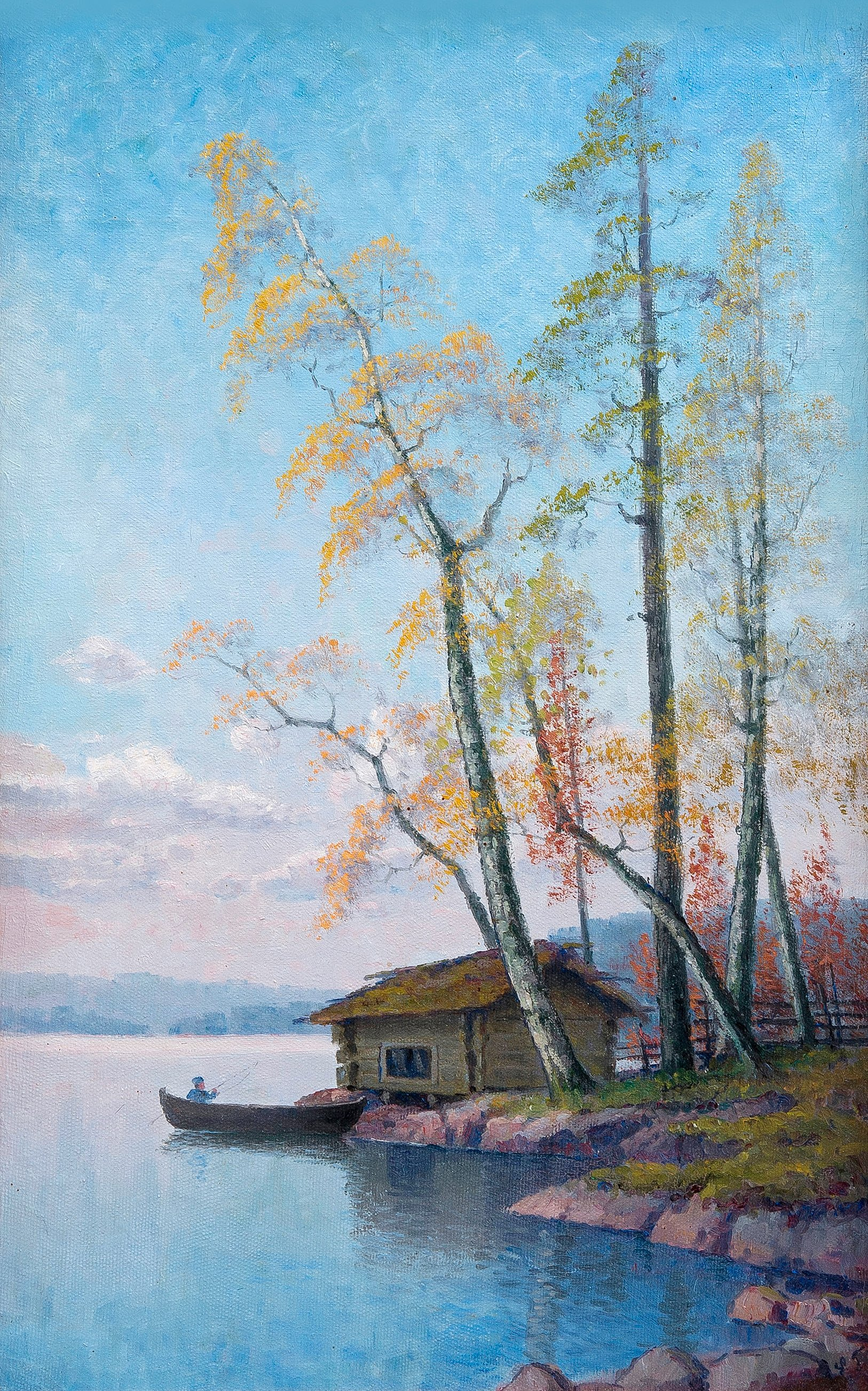
Autumn Evening

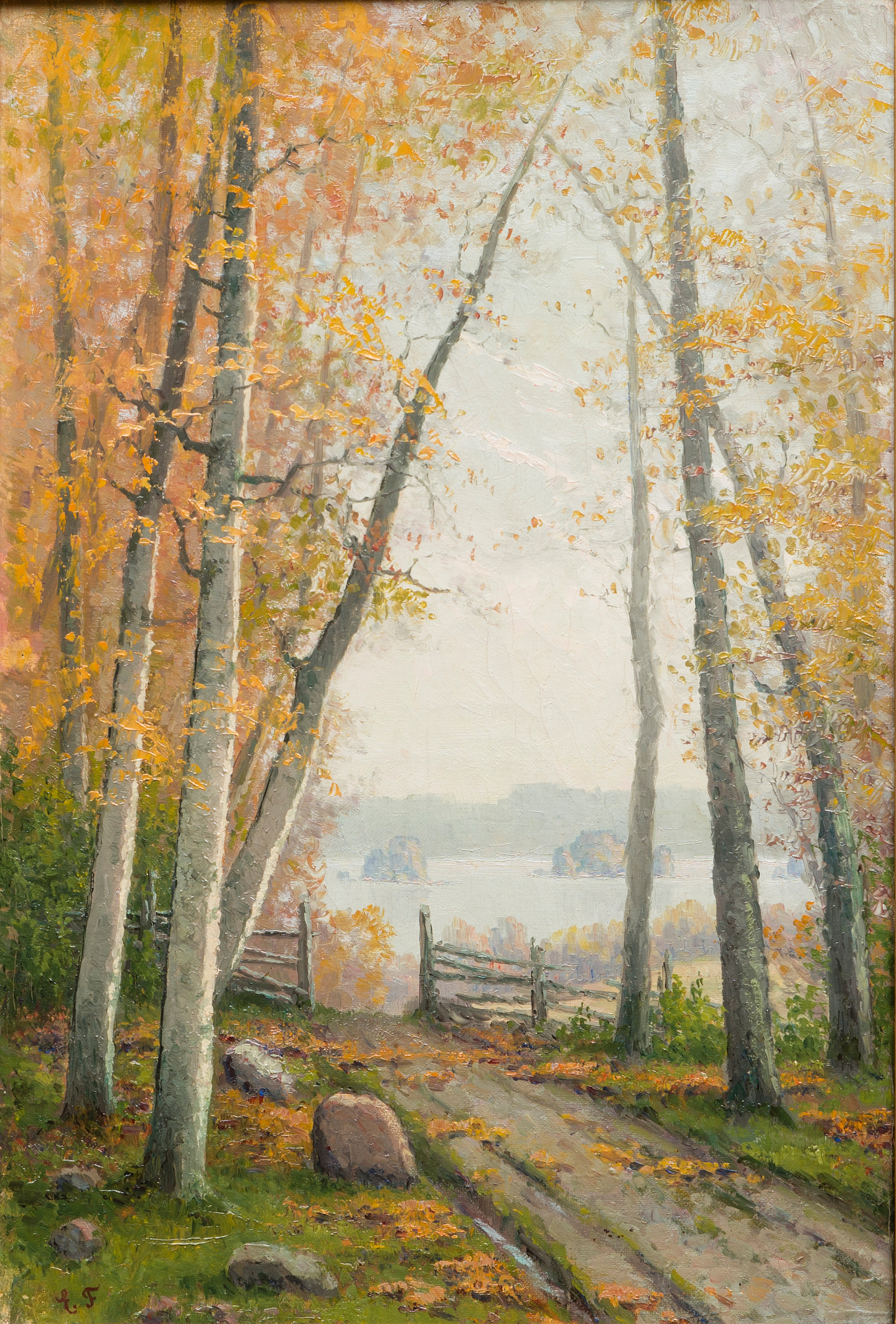
Autumn Landscape

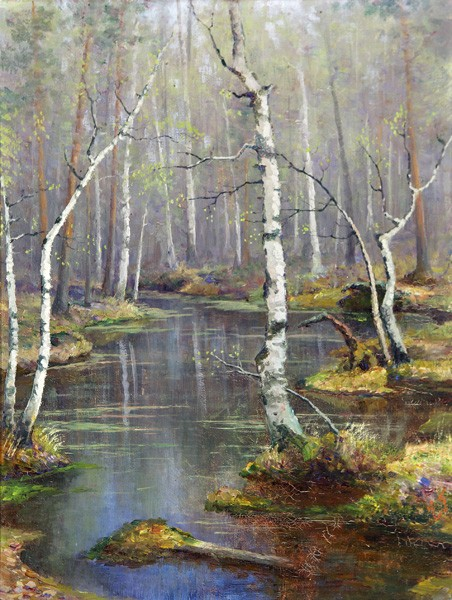
Spring Creek
