= Tirkkonen =

Tirkkonen is a Finnish surname. Notable people with the surname include:

- Paavo Tirkkonen (1947–2012), Finnish ice hockey player
- Paul Tirkkonen (1884–1968), Finnish wrestler
- Pekka Tirkkonen (born 1968), Finnish ice hockey player and coach
- Nikolai Tirkkonen (1875–1926), Finnish merchant
- Theodor Tirkkonen (1883–1951), Finnish wrestler
