= Lyhdynkantajat =

Sculptures at Helsinki Central railway station, Finland

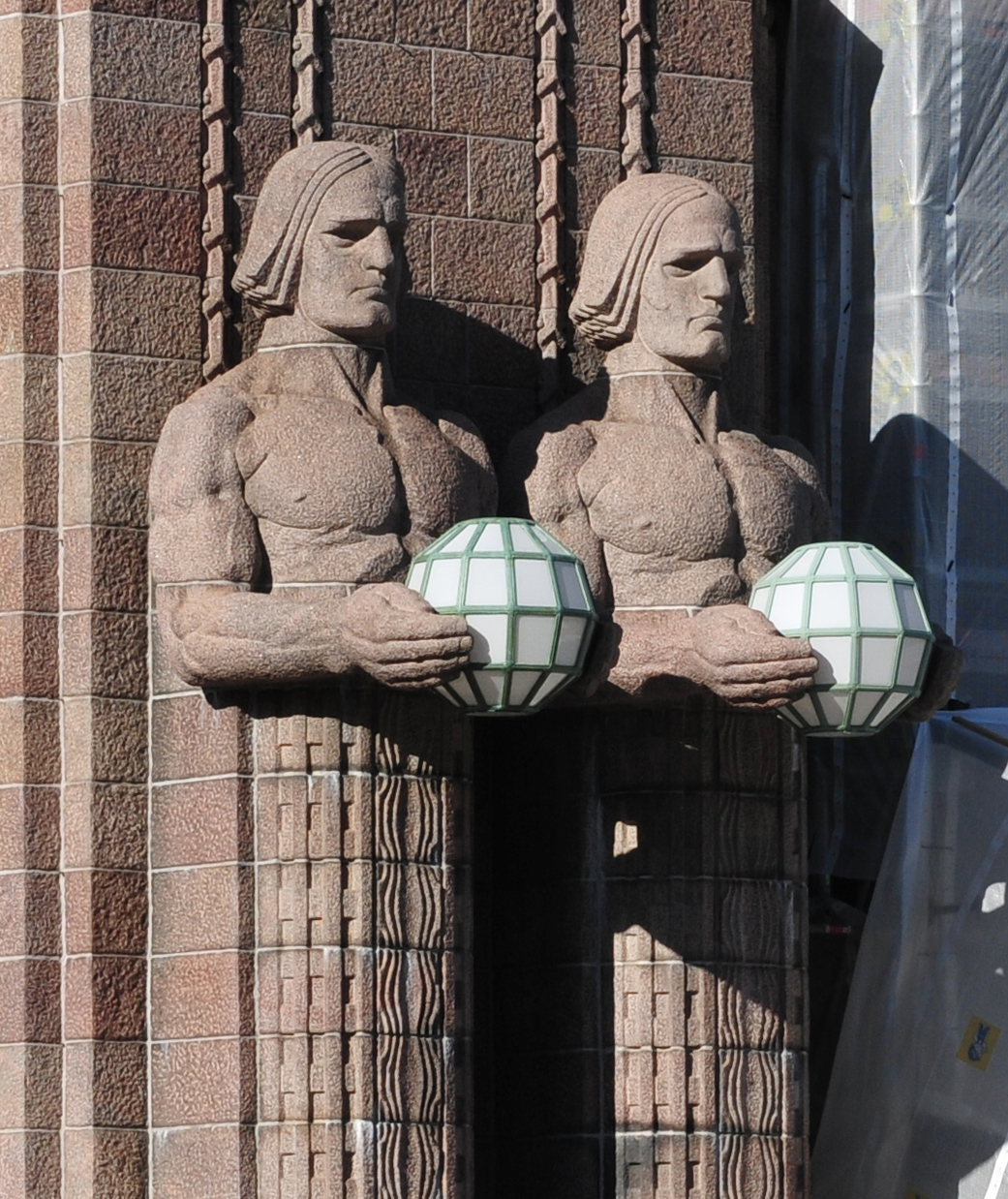
Two of the Lyhdynkantajat sculptures.

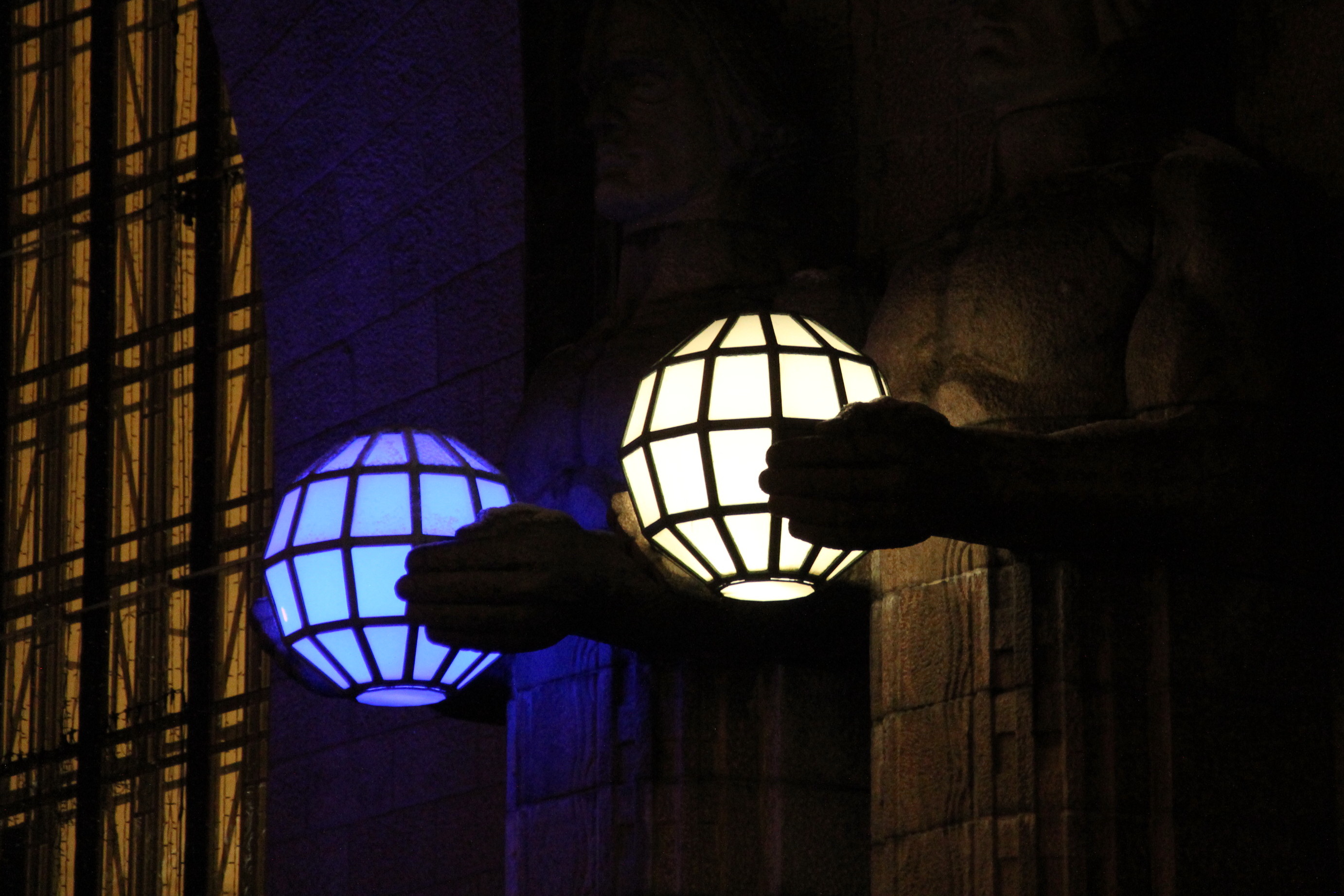
At night time, the spherical lanterns borne by the sculptures are lit.

Lyhdynkantajat (Finnish for "the lantern bearers") is a group of sculptures at the main entrance to the Helsinki Central Station in Helsinki, Finland. The sculptures were designed by Emil Wikström and completed in 1914. Lyhdynkantajat is part of the façade of the Art Nouveau station designed by Eliel Saarinen.

The sculptures consist of four male figures made of granite, bearing spherical lamps in their hands. The square-jawed figures have muscular chests, but the bottom parts of their bodies consist of columns decorated in a way typical to Saarinen. The men have haircuts typical of the Awakening movement. It is said that the peasant Jalmari Lehtinen, born in the late 19th century, posed as a model for the figures. Lehtinen, who had worked as a gardener in Wikström's Visavuori home studio, had served as the model for some of Wikström's earlier sculptures as well. The Visavuori art museum contains many competition sketches of the Lyhdynkantajat sculptures. The granite figures have probably been made at the Ab Granit Oy factory in Hanko, like the pedestal of the Elias Lönnrot monument. The actual sculpting was done by a sculptor named Talja and his son. The bear figures of the old Vyborg railway station in Vyborg, Russia were also made by the aforementioned men.

The Lyhdynkantajat sculptures combine romantic nationalist granite Art Nouveau style with ancient art. Saarinen's first sketches of the sculptures feature bears, which had also been used at the old Vyborg railway station as well as the main stairway of the National Museum of Finland. However, Saarinen ended up ordering the four male figures designed by Wikström. The four giant stylised male figures have each been sculpted with the same gypsum model. The sculptures have been compared to massive stone sculptures found in Egyptian and Assyrian sculpture art. Wikström was interested in ancient sculpture art, and the figures were inspired by ancient herms, columns whose upper part was sculpted to resemble a human figure, originally that of the god Hermes. In Wikström's time, herms were also a popular phenomenon in the architecture of Vienna, Austria.

Emil Wikström, the designer of the Lyhdynkantajat sculptures, was one of the most important sculptors during the Golden Age of Finnish Art. Besides Lyhdynkantajat he designed other architectural sculptures, such as the bear sculpture of the main stairway of the National Museum and the bronze sculptures at the end triangle of the House of the Estates.

== Lyhdynkantajat in VR's advertisements and in culture ==
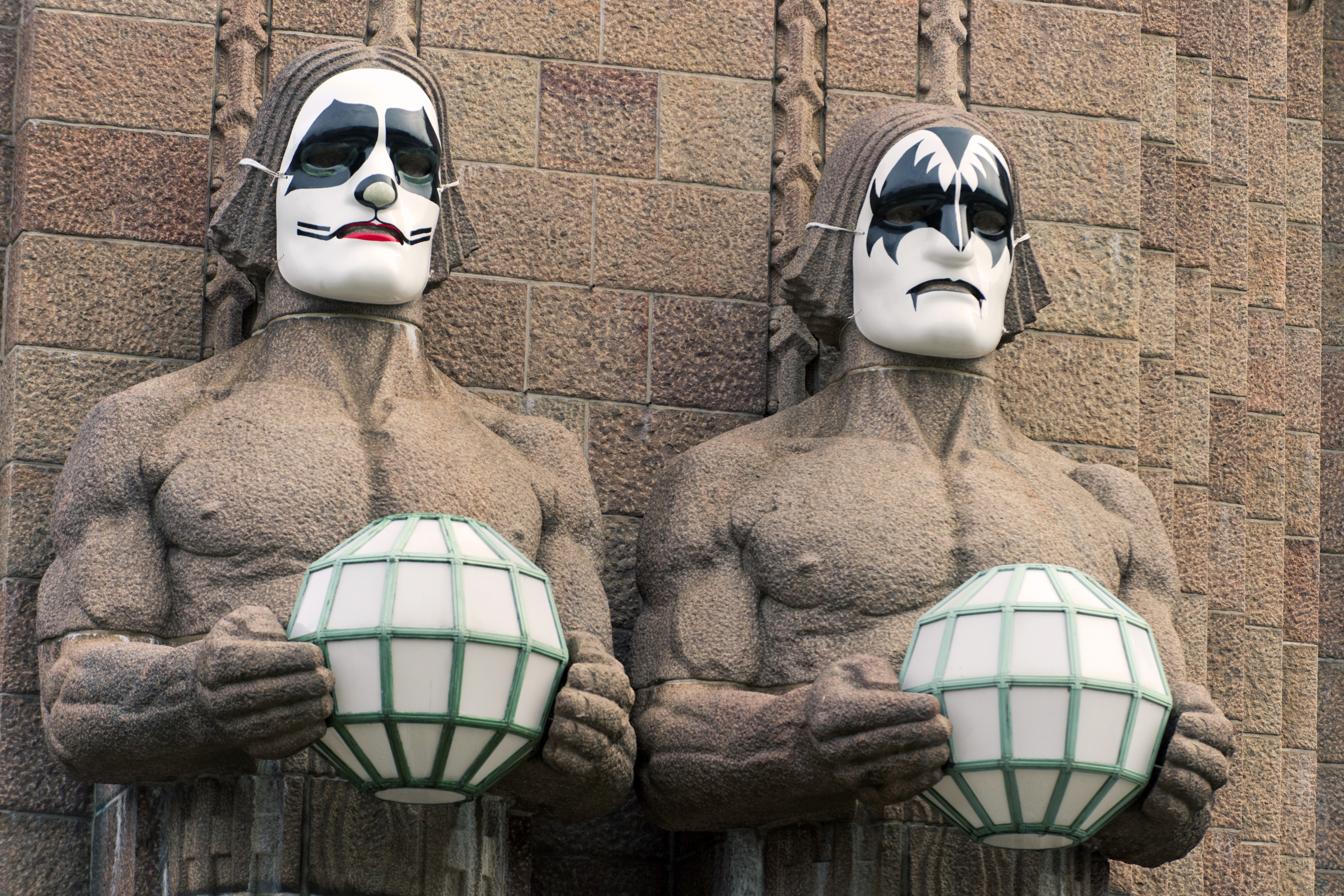
When Kiss gave a concert in Helsinki in 2017 the sculptures bore appropriate face masks.

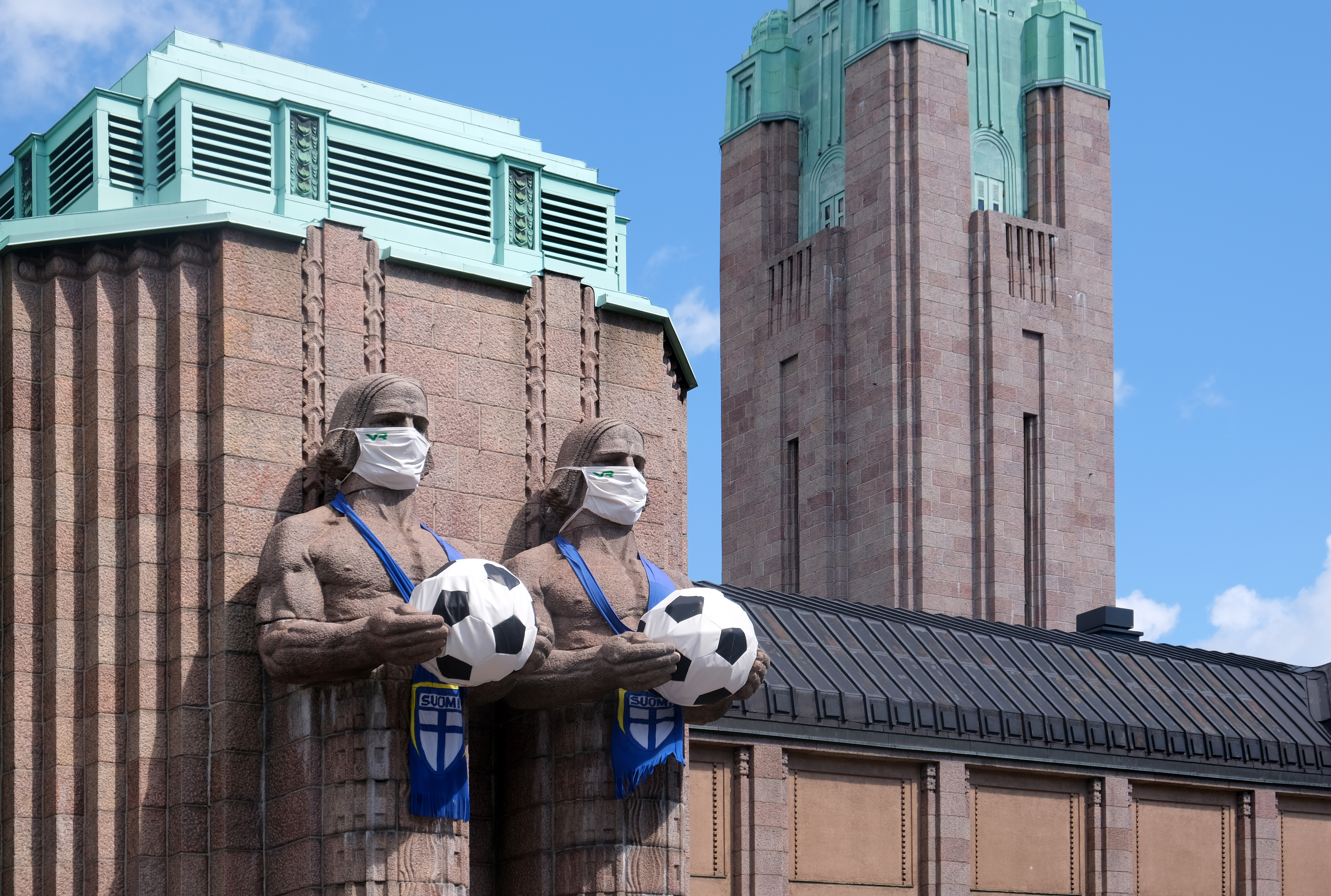
Lyhdynkantajat in 2021 supporting the Finland national football team.

The Lyhdynkantajat sculptures are well known. According to a survey by Helsingin Sanomat in 2008 Lyhdynkantajat was the tenth most popular of the four hundred outdoor sculptures in Helsinki. The winner was Äidinrakkaus ("Motherly love") by Emil Cedercreutz, with Havis Amanda by Ville Vallgren at the second place.

Lyhdynkantajat have entered public knowledge under the name Kivimiehet ("The stone men") via an advertisement campaign by the VR Group. The sculptures have been used in print advertisements through image manipulation and animated on television since 2002. In the advertisements, the sculptures have got legs and have travelled to several cities across Finland, have spent a winter vacation in Lapland and discussed a cleaner environment at the statue conference in Verona, Italy. They have also been dressed in various outfits.

The stone men campaign paid well off: the sympathetic characters caused VR's public image to rise and interest in train travel to increase. The stone men campaign has won several prizes, such as the Grand Effie and Gold Effie prizes for efficient marketing information. Marketing Finland has also awarded the Advertiser of the Year prize to the VR Group in 2007.

As well as the VR Group advertisements, Lyhdynkantajat has been featured in the drawings by cartoonist Kari Suomalainen.

The Linnanmäki amusement park also includes reconstructions of the Lyhdynkantajat sculptures. There they support the railing of the monorail train going around the park at the level of building roofs.

== Renovation in summer 2013 ==
The sculptures were renovated and cleaned in summer 2013. They were dismantled into parts and taken into the Pasila machinery yard to be restored. The lamps in the lanterns borne by the sculptures were also renewed and replaced by LED lights to achieve better conservation of energy and better functionality.
