= Wahlroos =

Wahlroos is a Finnish surname. Notable people with the surname include:

- Björn Wahlroos (born 1952), CEO of Sampo Group
- Dora Wahlroos (1870–1947), Finnish painter
- Drew Wahlroos (1980–2017), American football player
