= Emil Wikström =

Finnish sculptor

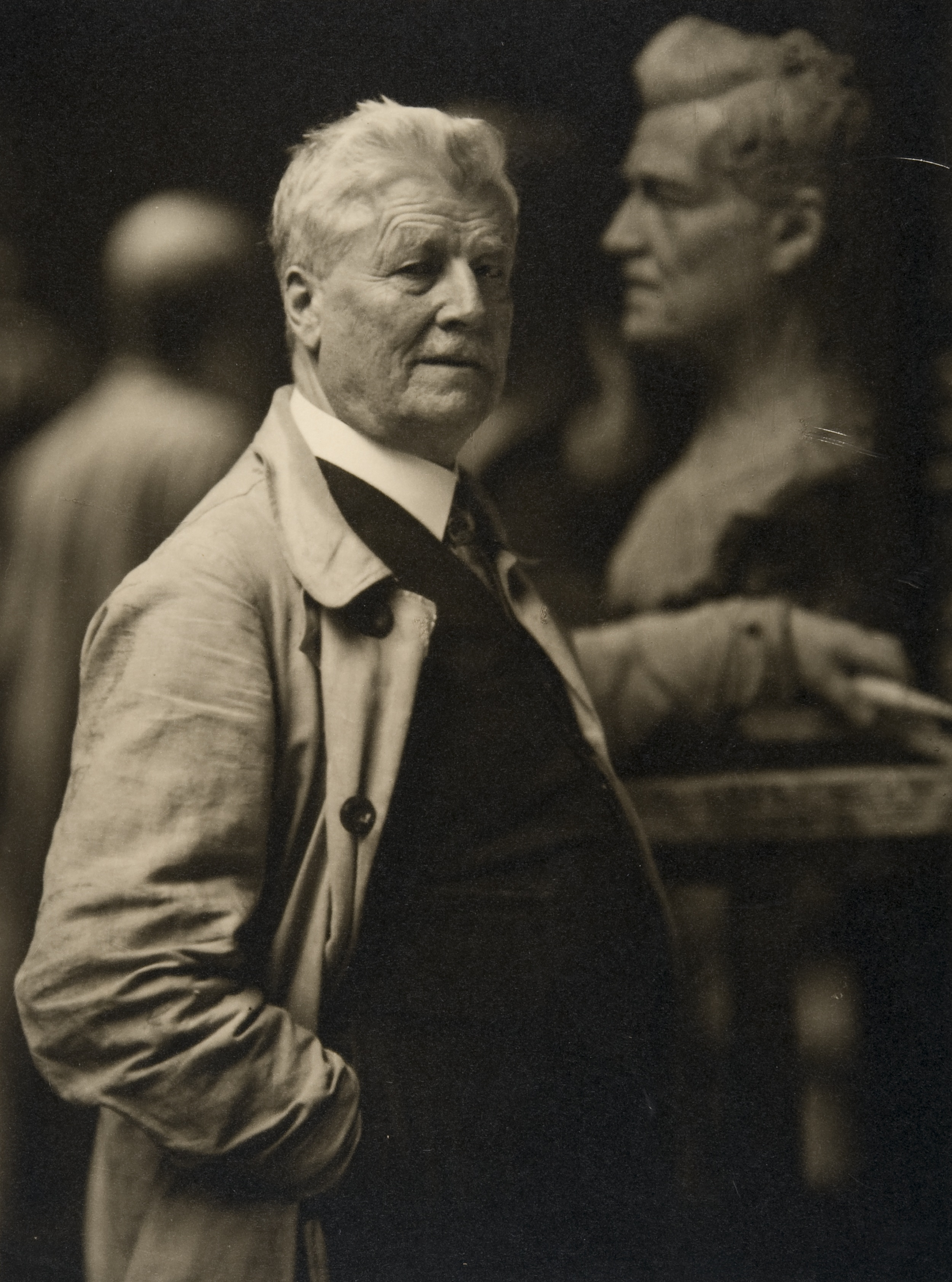
- Wikström in the 1930s
- Born: 13 April 1864; Turku, Grand Duchy of Finland, Russian Empire (now Finland)
- Died: 26 September 1942 (aged 78); Helsinki, Finland
- Known for: Sculpture

Emil Wikström (13 April 1864 in Turku – 26 September 1942 in Helsinki) was a Finnish sculptor. Among his best known works are the Lyhdynkantajat ("Lantern Carriers") sculptures on the front of the Helsinki Central railway station and the monuments to Elias Lönnrot and Johan Vilhelm Snellman.

== Career ==
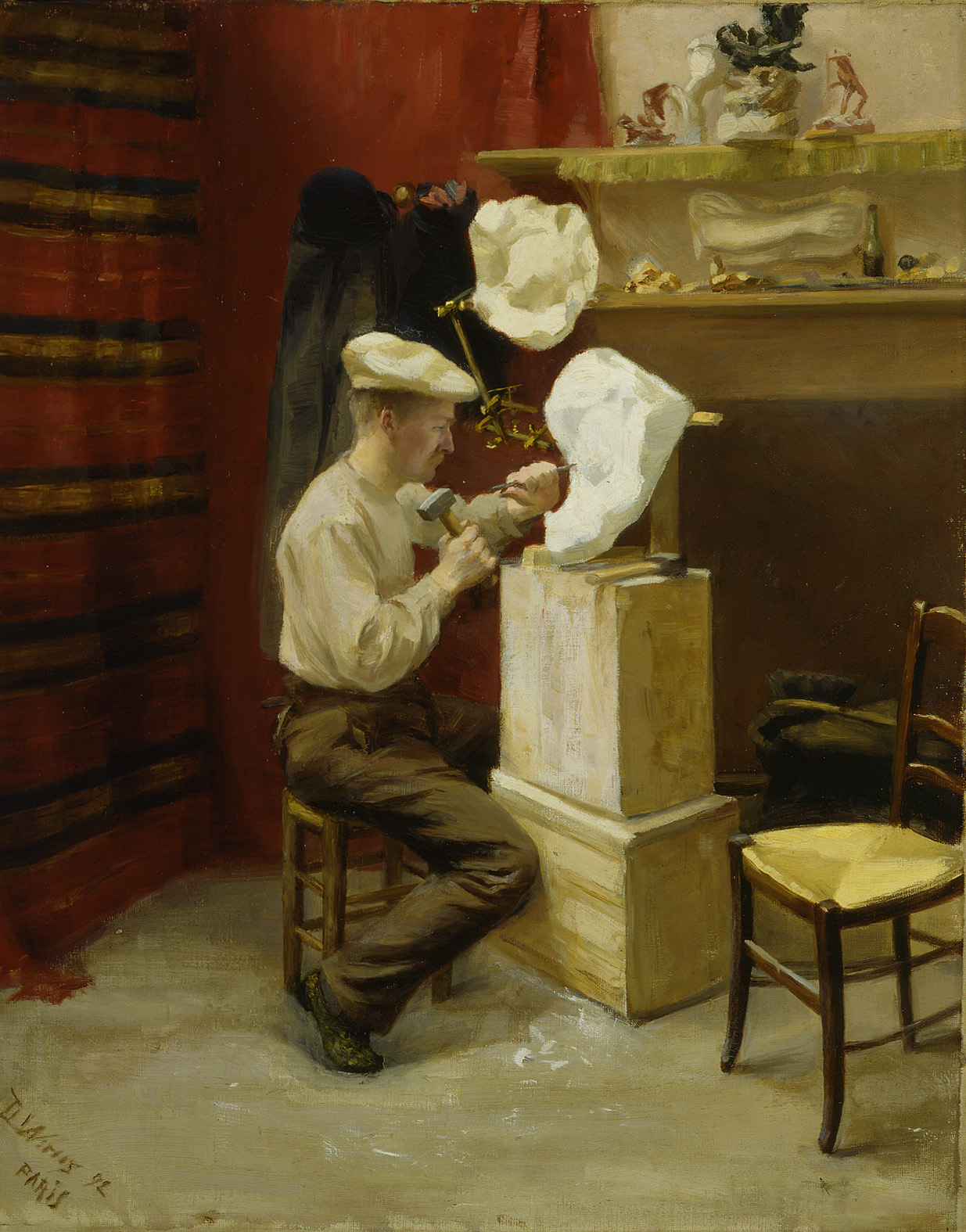
Portrait of him in his Paris atelier by Dora Wahlroos, his fiancée in 1892

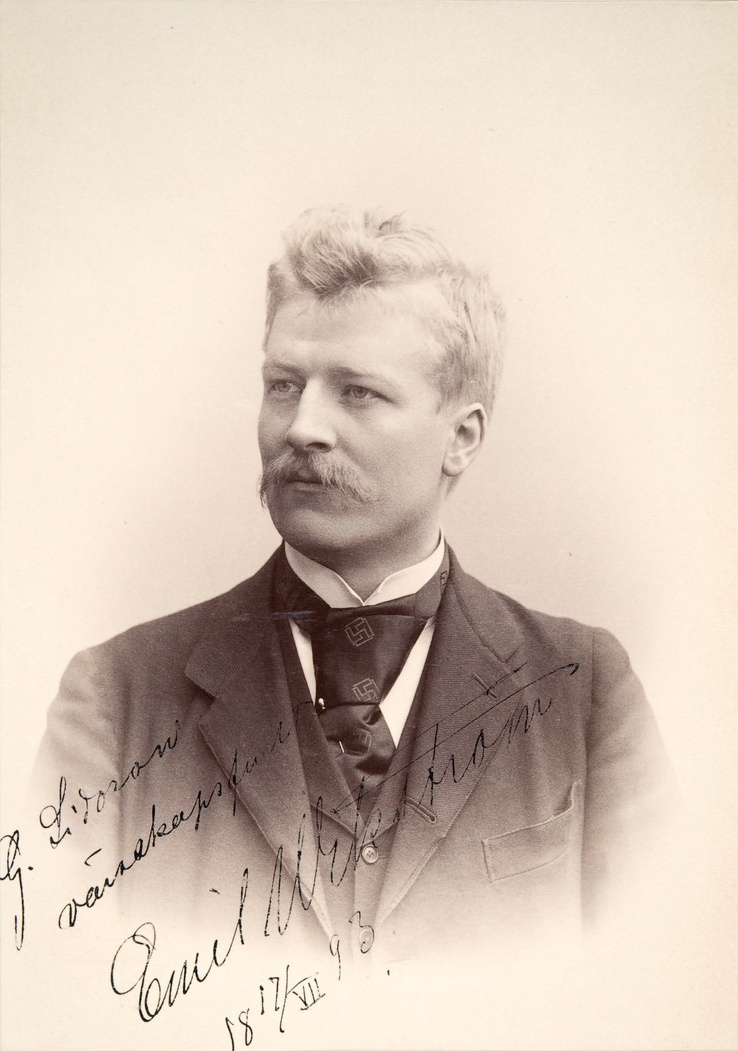
Wikström in 1893

His parents were construction foreman Johan Erik Wikström and Gustava Samuelintytär Linnamäki. Emil Wikström studied art in Finnish Art Association's drawing school in Turku and Helsinki, in the Academy of Fine Arts in Vienna and also in Académie Julian in Paris. Wikström as well as other artists took inspiration for their art from their own country's cultural mythology. Finnish artists studied and worked in Paris. Some decided to retreat to the peace of the forest, as Wikström wrote in a letter to Axel Gallén in 1898. Wikström was the first to carry out his plan and found ideal place for himself in Sääksmäki by Vanajavesi.

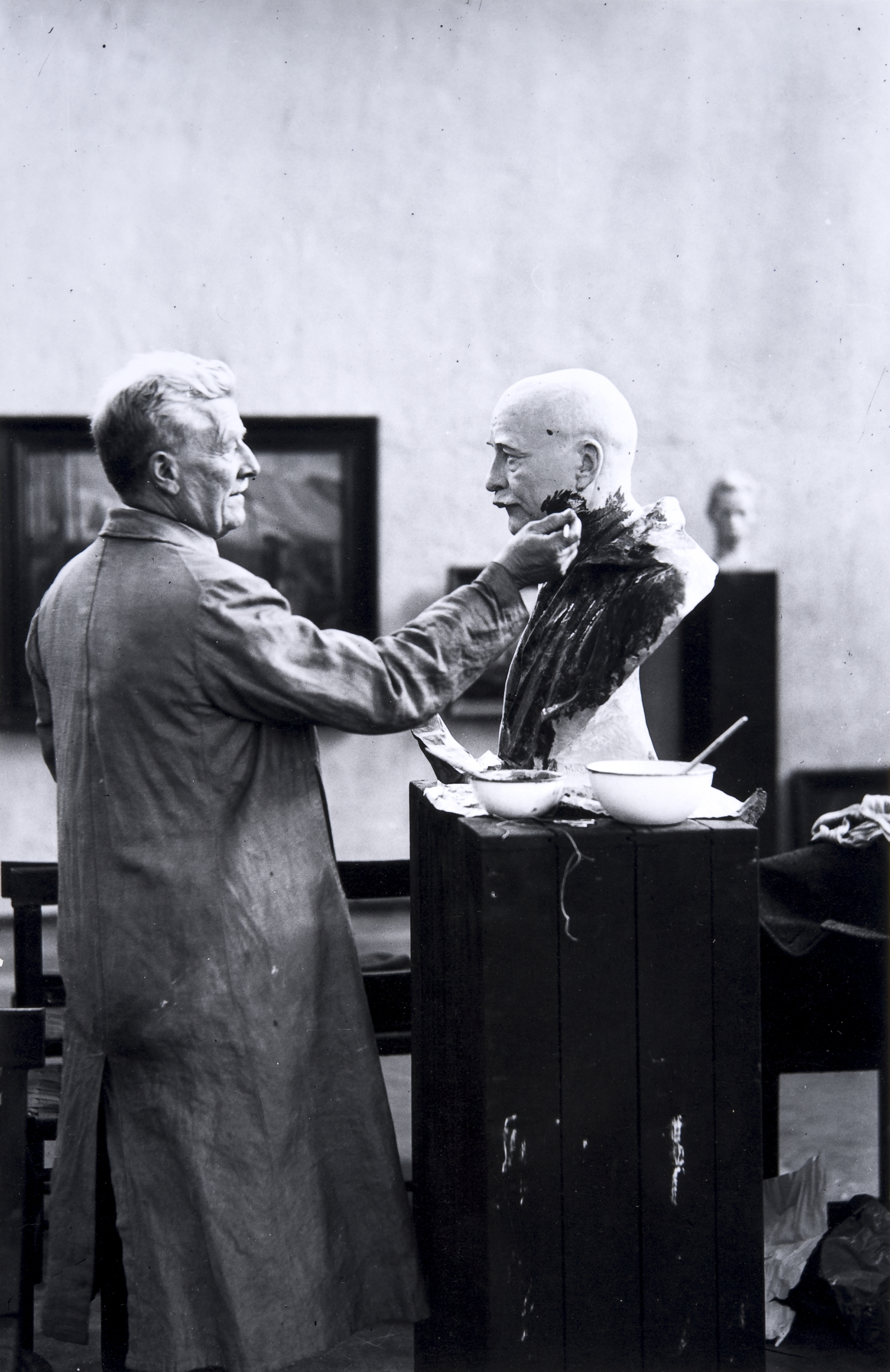
Wikstörm working in Visavuori in 1932

Emil Wikström sculpted most of his work in Visavuori, his home and studio in Valkeakoski. Wikström was one of the most important Finnish sculptors of his time. Best remembered for his public monuments in Helsinki, the statues at the railway station, and other cities across Finland, Wikström produced portraits of many statesmen, politicians, businessmen, family and friends, as well as figures from Finnish mythology.

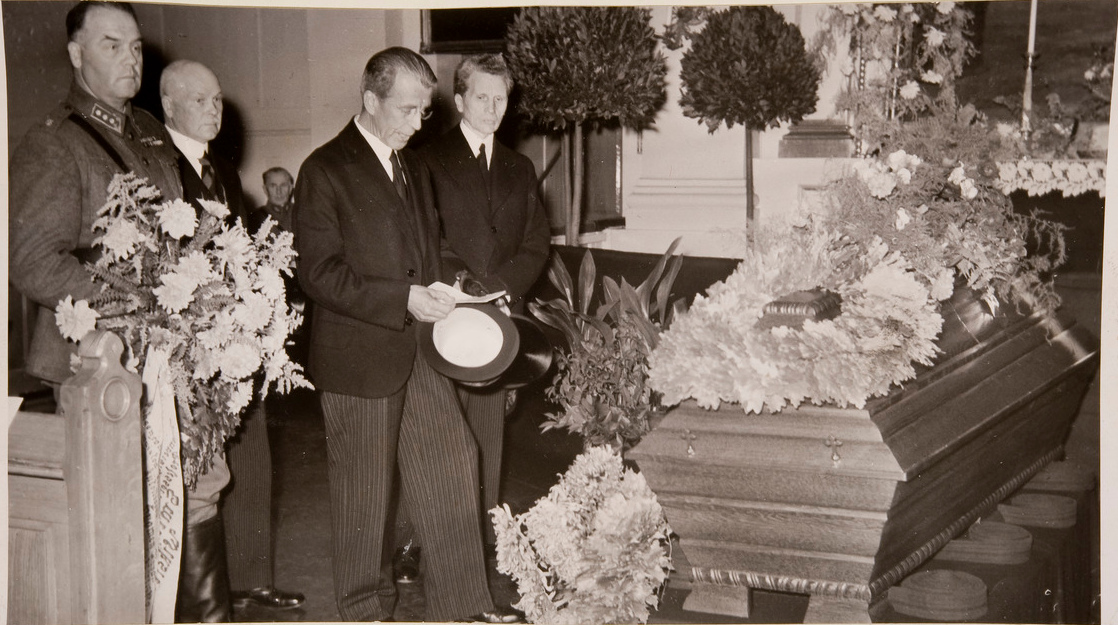
Representatives of the Association of Finnish Sculptors put down a wreath by his coffin, 2 October 1942

He is buried in the Hietaniemi Cemetery in Helsinki.

Visavuori was opened to the public as a museum in 1967. There, many of the original casts and studies are on display.

== Personal life ==
In 1890, he got engaged to painter Dora Wahlroos and they studied arts at Paris together. However, they drifted apart and in 1895 Wikström married Alice Högström (1863–1950). They had three daughters: Estelle, Anna-Liisa and Mielikki Anne-Marie. Estelle's son Kari Suomalainen was a famous cartoonist, and her daughter Saskia (a.k.a. Maaria Eira) was an opera singer and director.

== Works ==
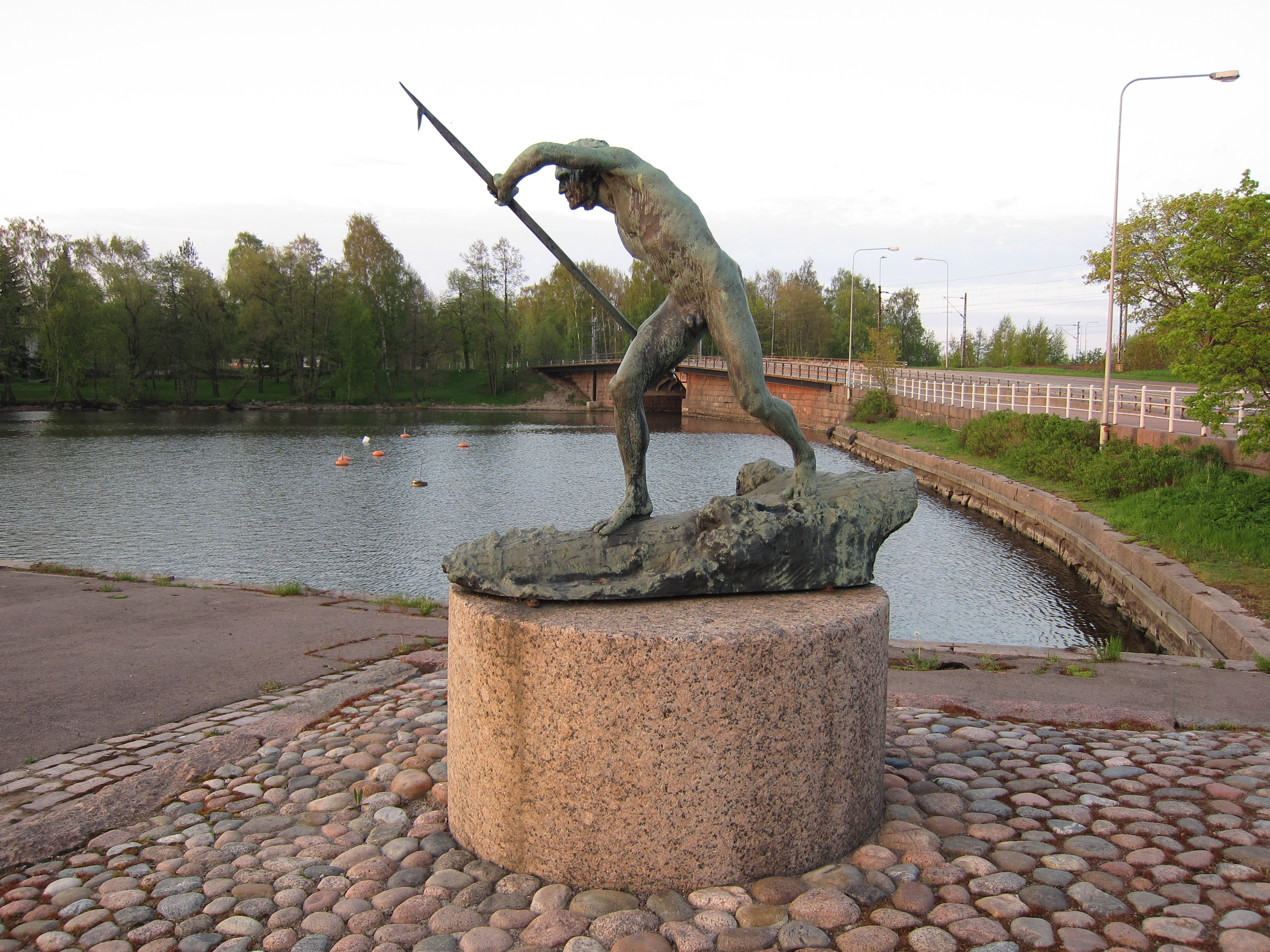
Log Driver
(the original sculpture is from 1890, and the photographed bronze copy from 1952) (fi)

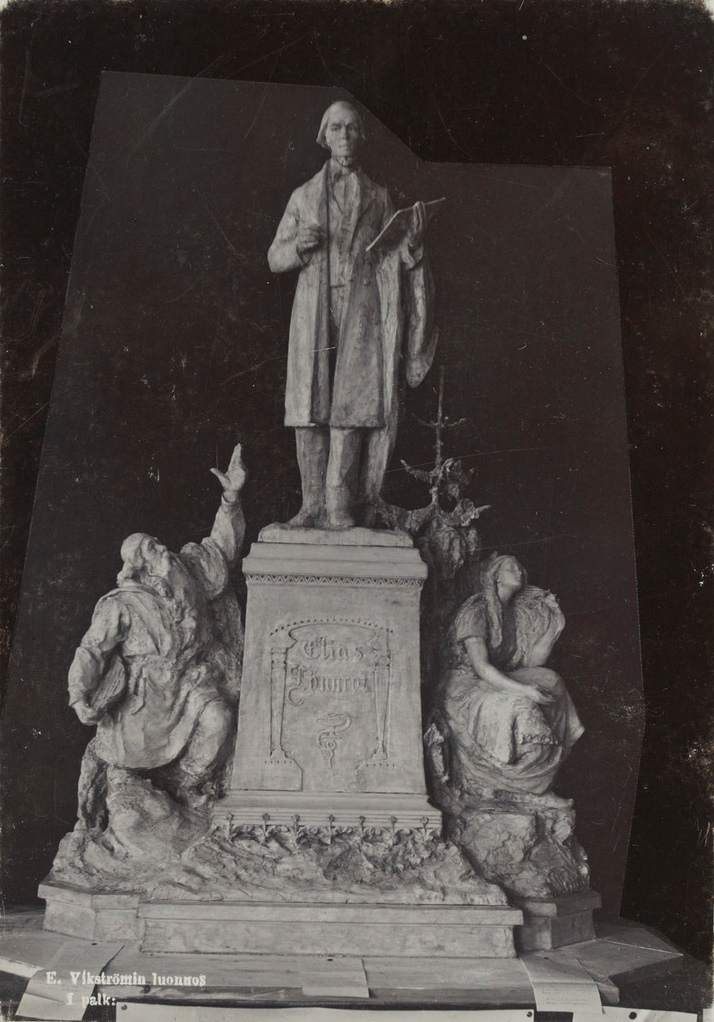
Early design of the monument to Elias Lönnrot (winner of the 1899 design competition)

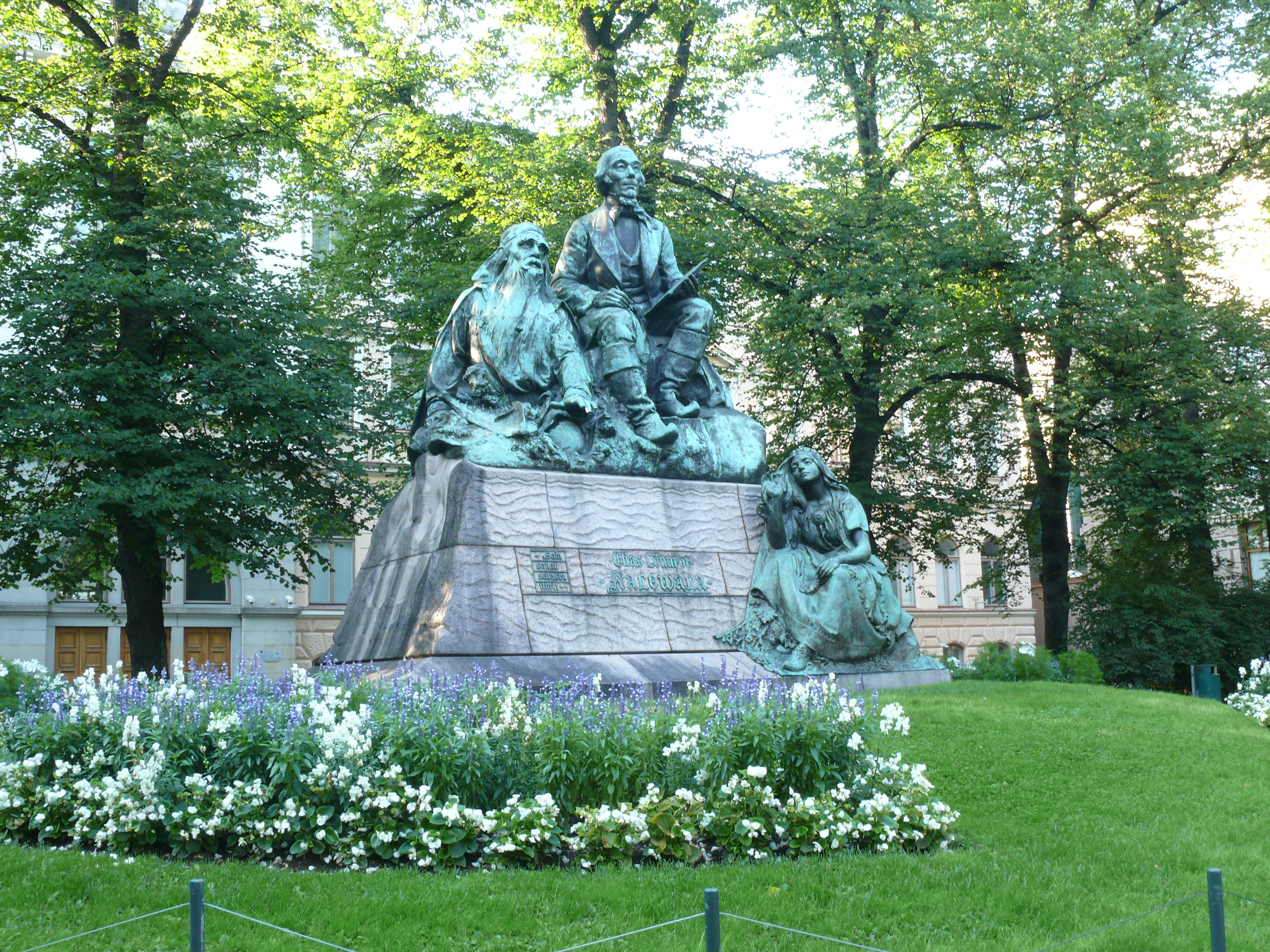
The complete Elias Lönnrot monument, 1902
(with Väinämöinen to his right and Impi to his left) (fi)

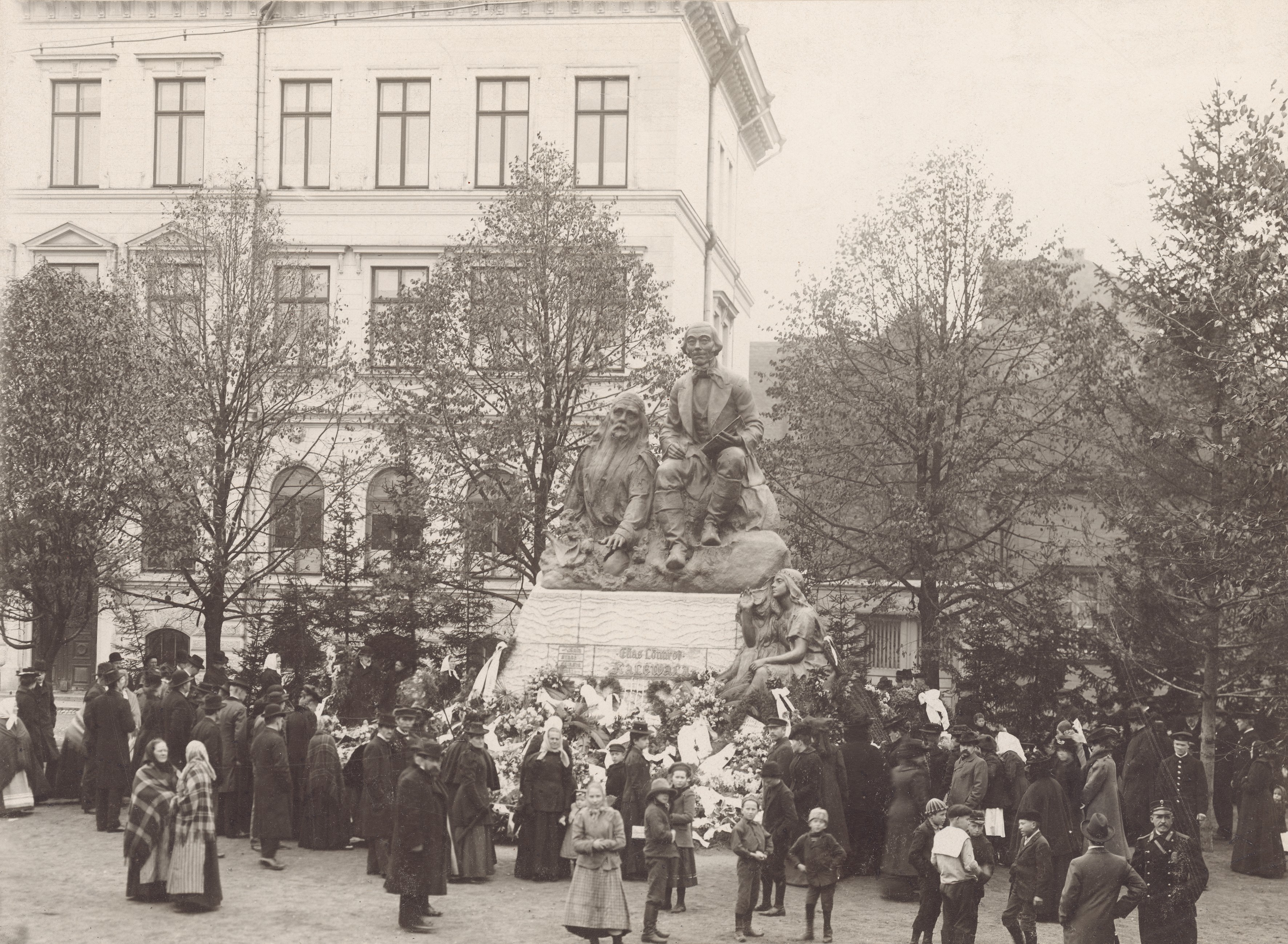
The statue of Lönnrot on the day of its reveal, 18 October 1902

Tympanum of the House of Estates depicting Alexander I at the 1809 Diet of Finland, 1903

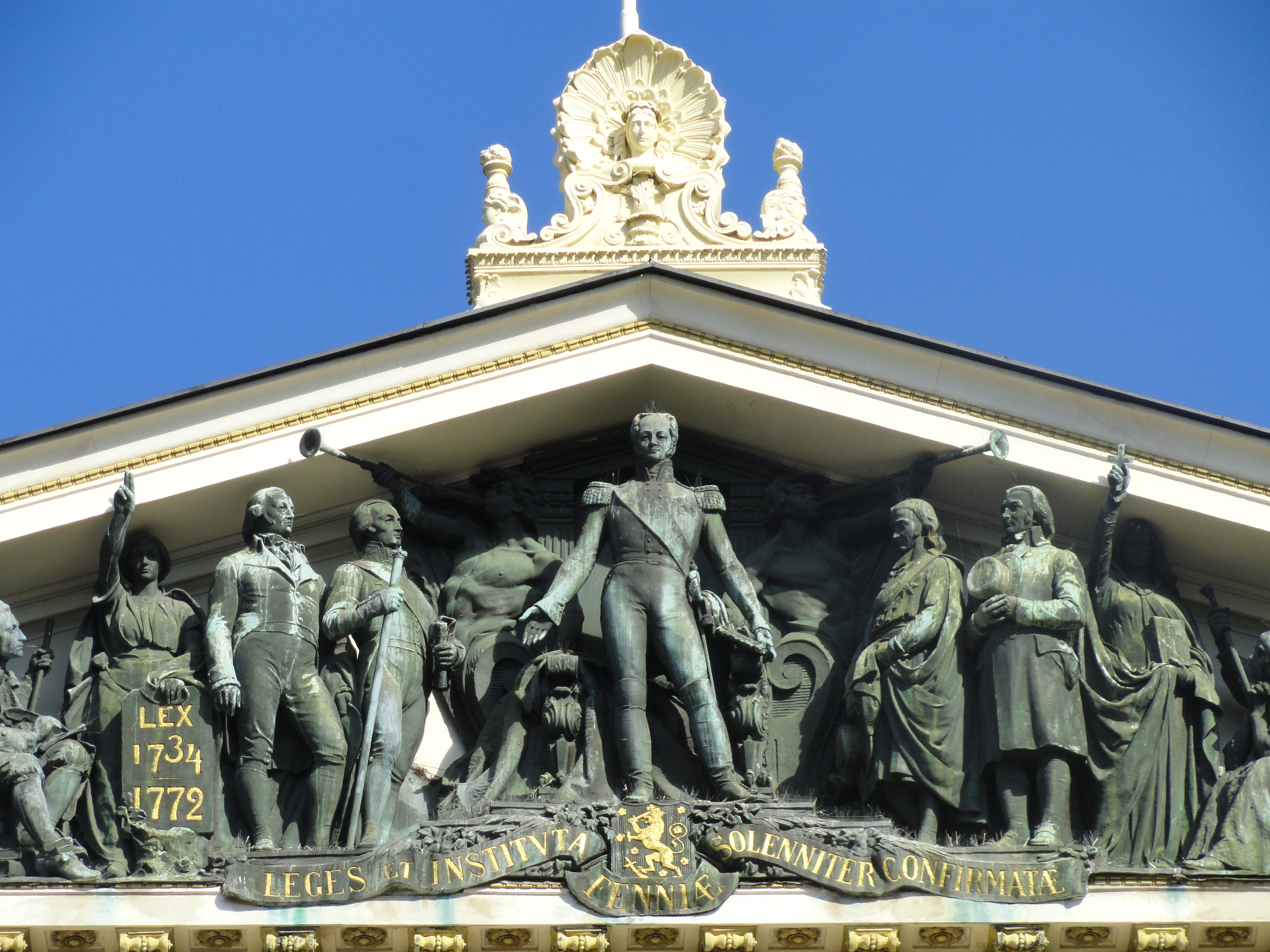
Close-up of the tympanum

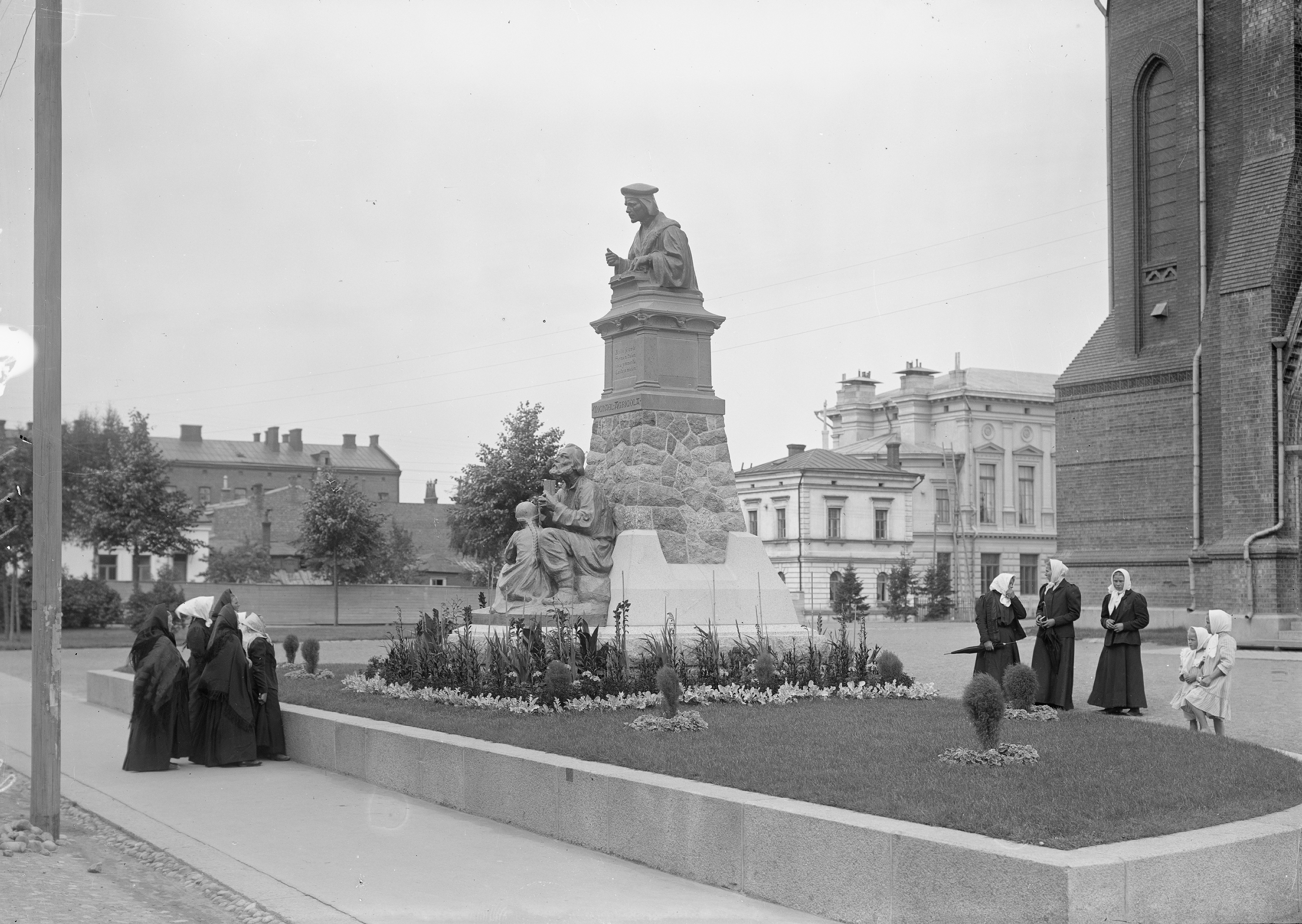
The original statue of Mikael Agricola in Vyborg, 1908
(lost in the Winter War) (fi)

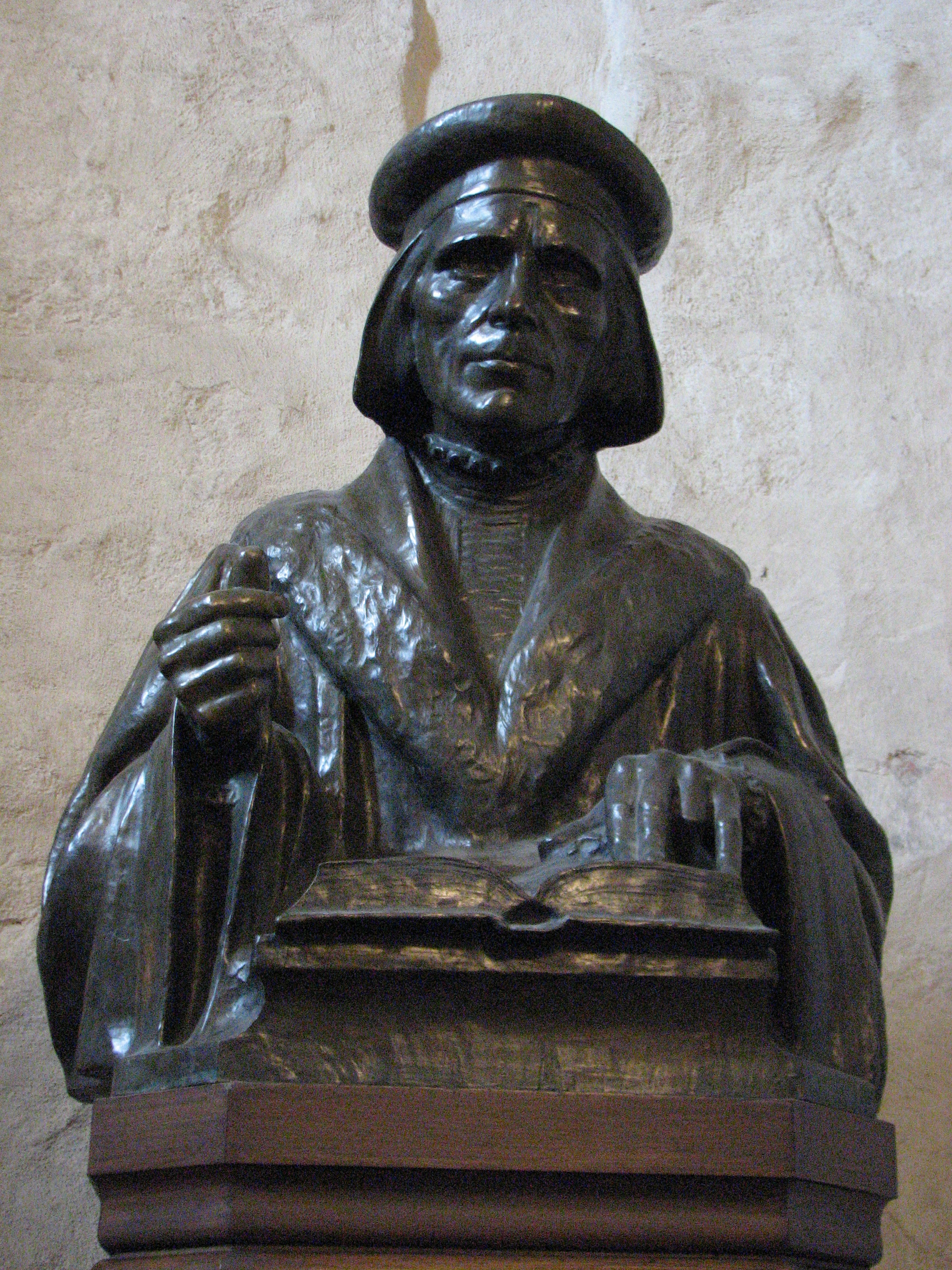
Bronze copy of the upper bust of Agricola in Turku, 1910

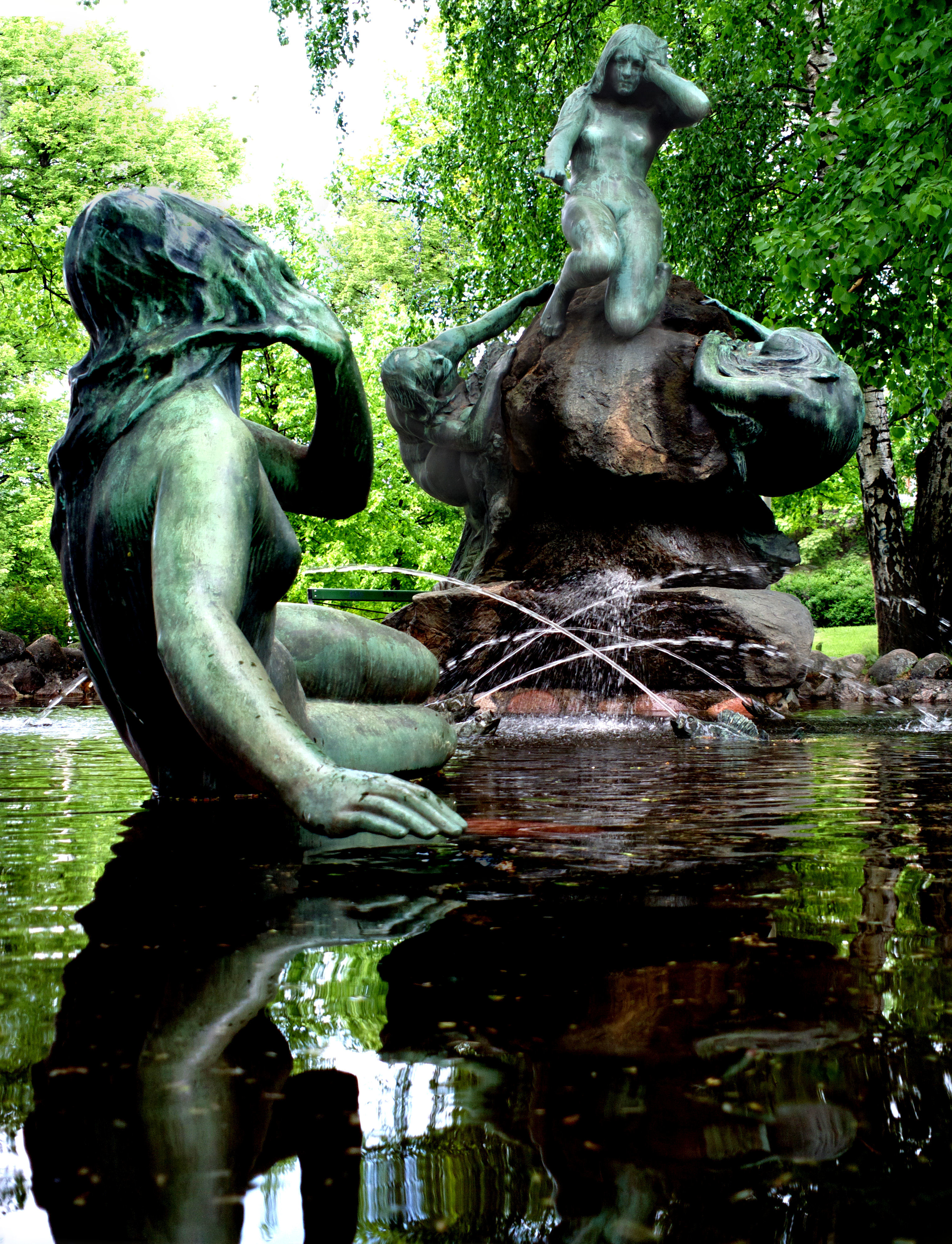
Aino Fountain in Lahti, 1912 (fi)

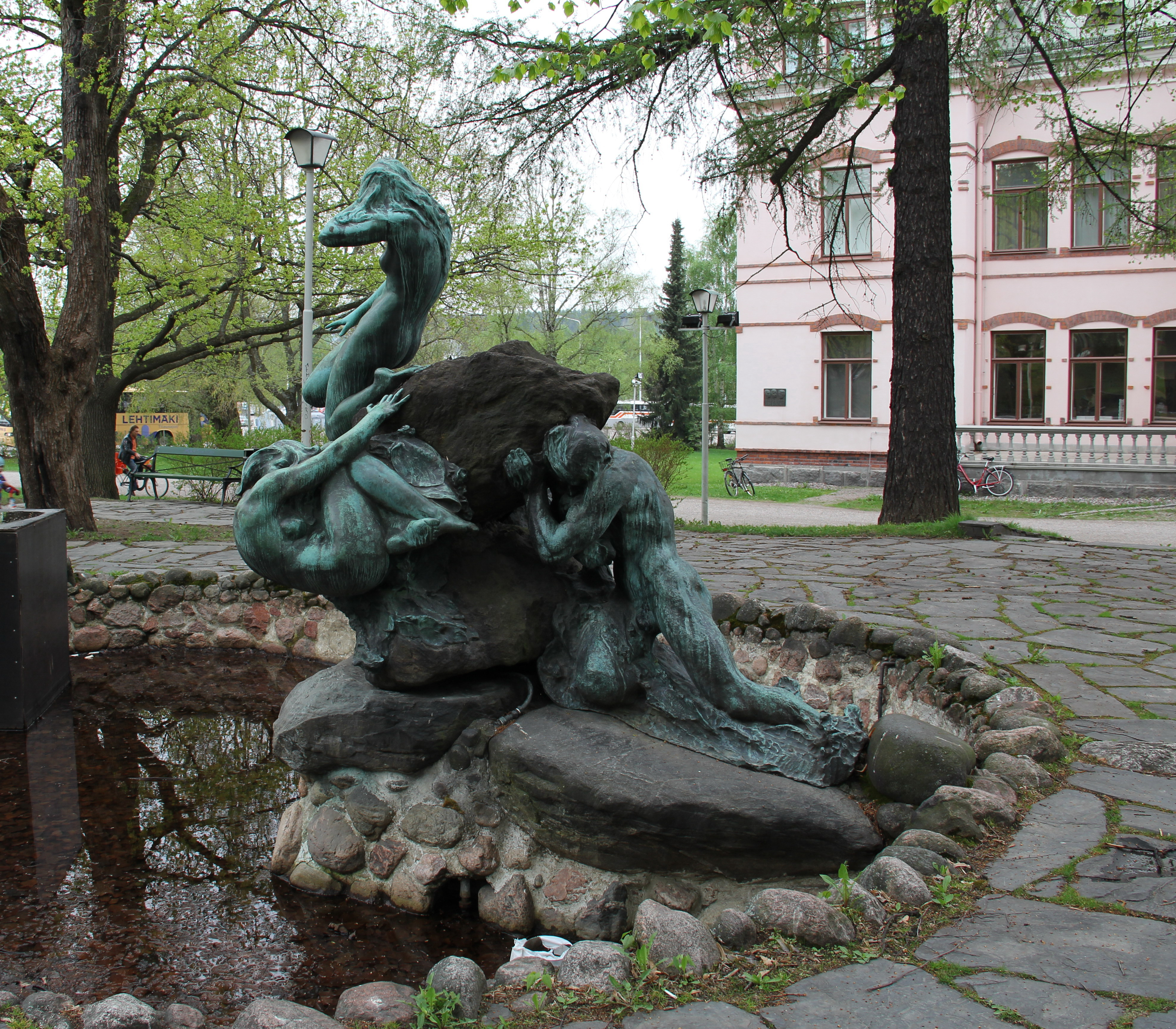
The fountain from the side (Aino is attempting to resist the call of the three water maidens of Vellamo, while a man of Ahtola is pushing the rock from behind)

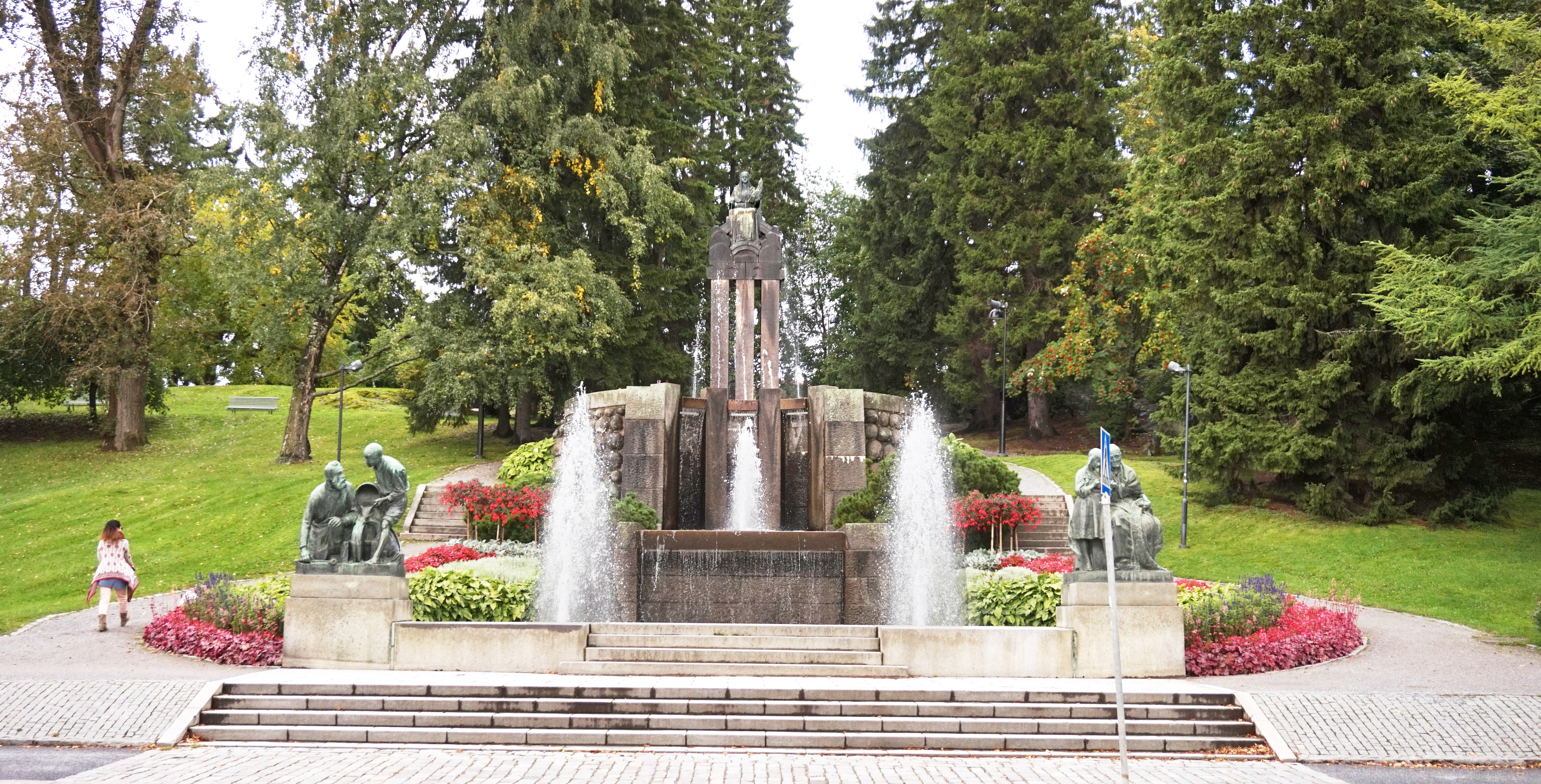
Näsikallio Fountain, 1913
(Also known as "The Tirkkonen fountain" because it was donated by Nikolai Tirkkonen. The top represents Maiden of Pohjola on a rainbow, and the bottom left statue the manufacturing industry and the right the cottage industry) (fi)

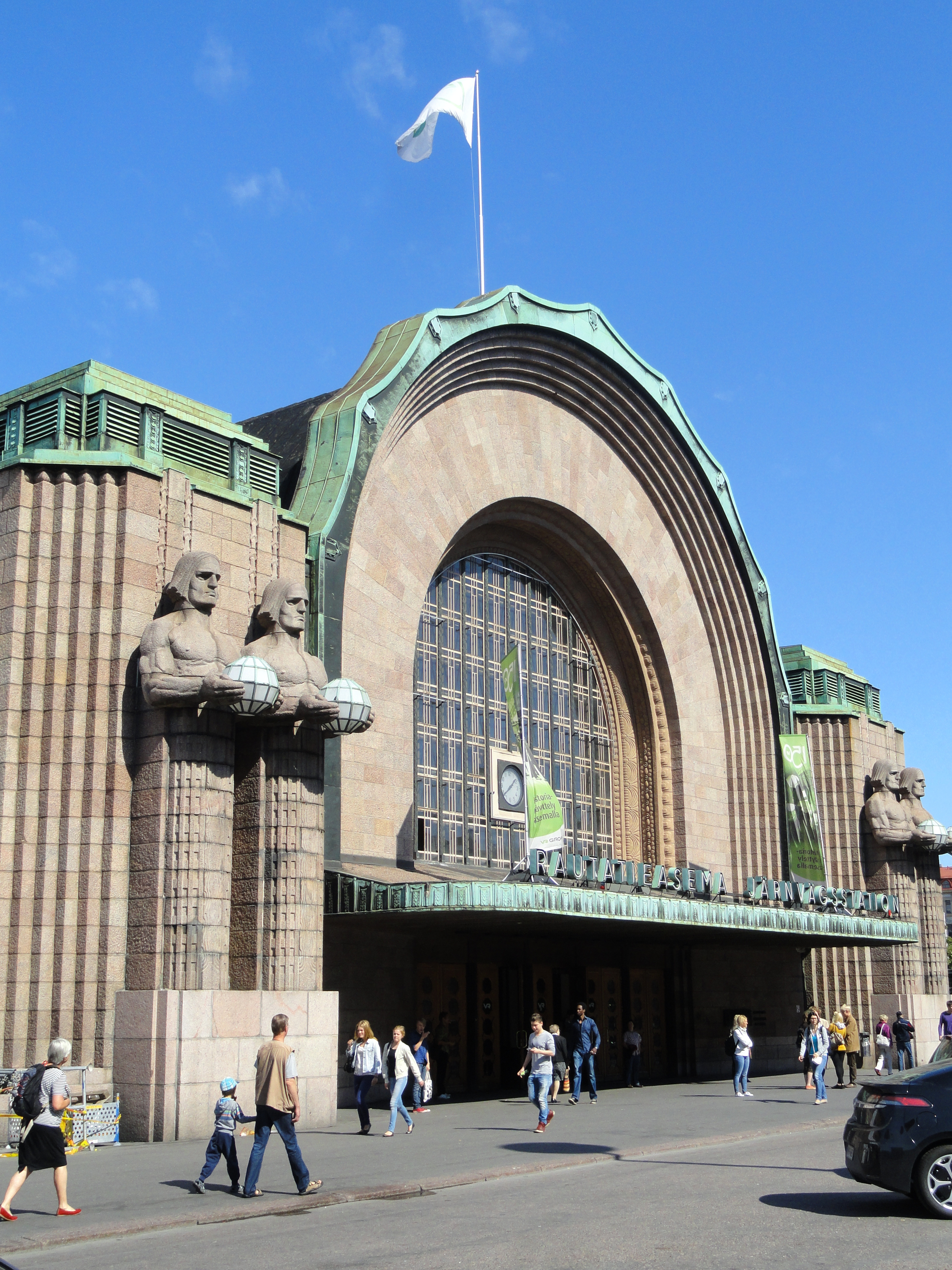
The Lyhdynkantajat ("Lantern Carriers") sculptures on the front of the Helsinki Central Station, 1914

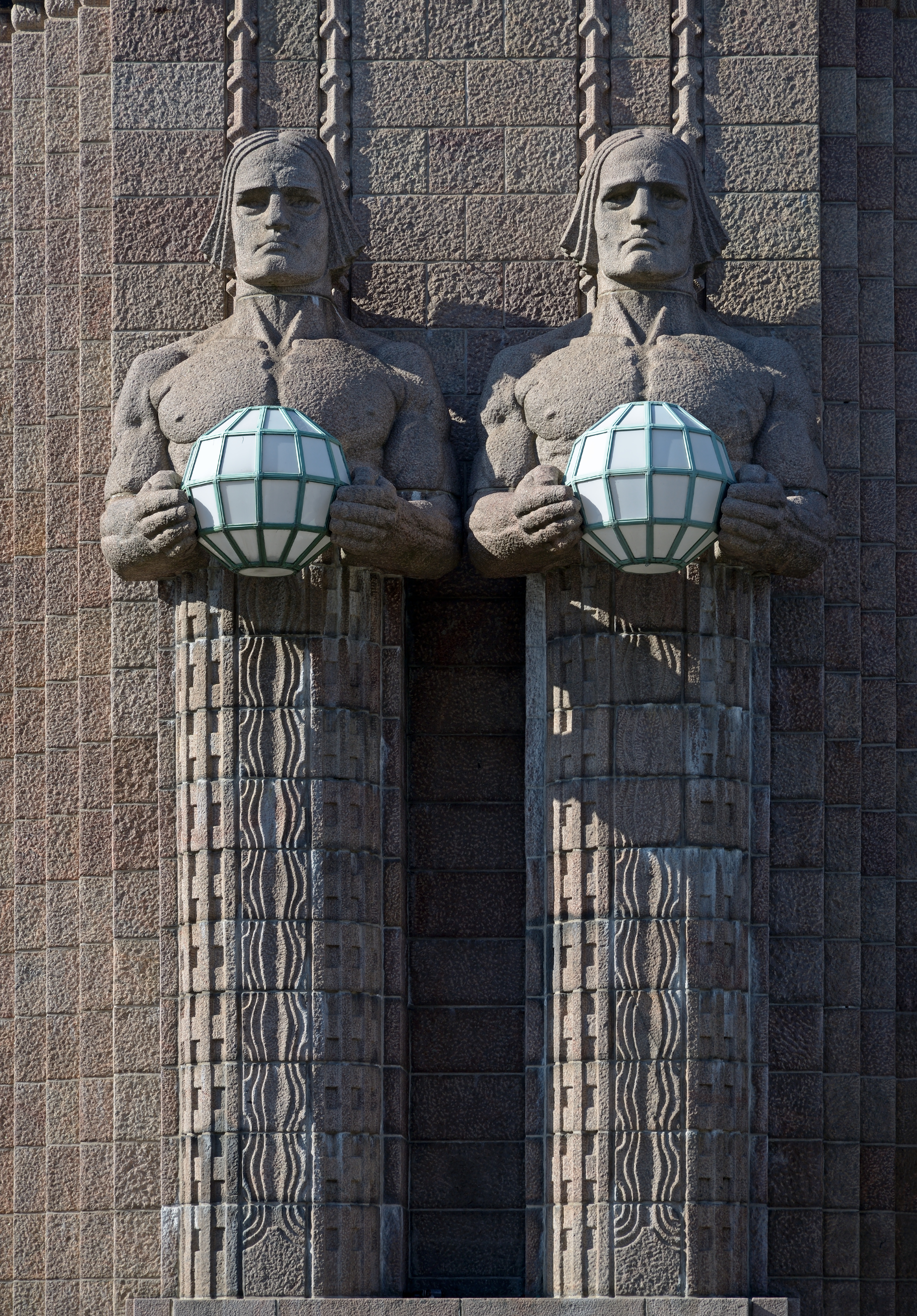
Close-up of the Lantern Carriers

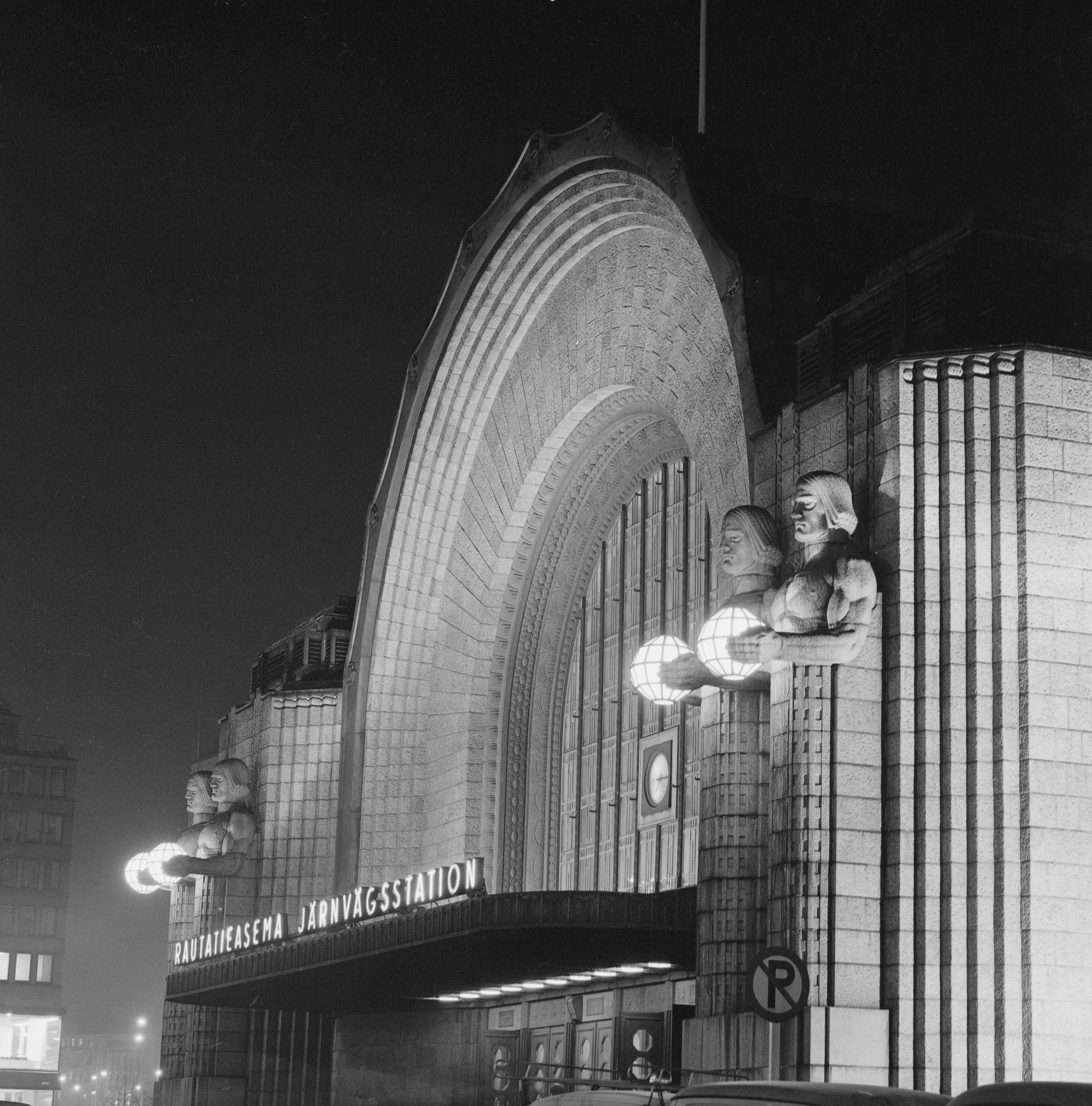
The Lantern Carriers illuminating the night in the 1970s

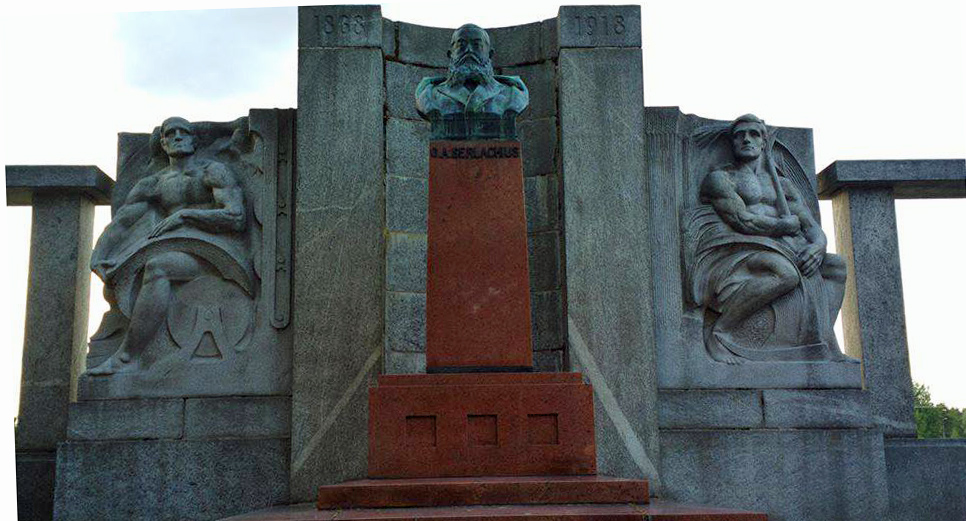
Monument to G. A. Serlachius, 1921

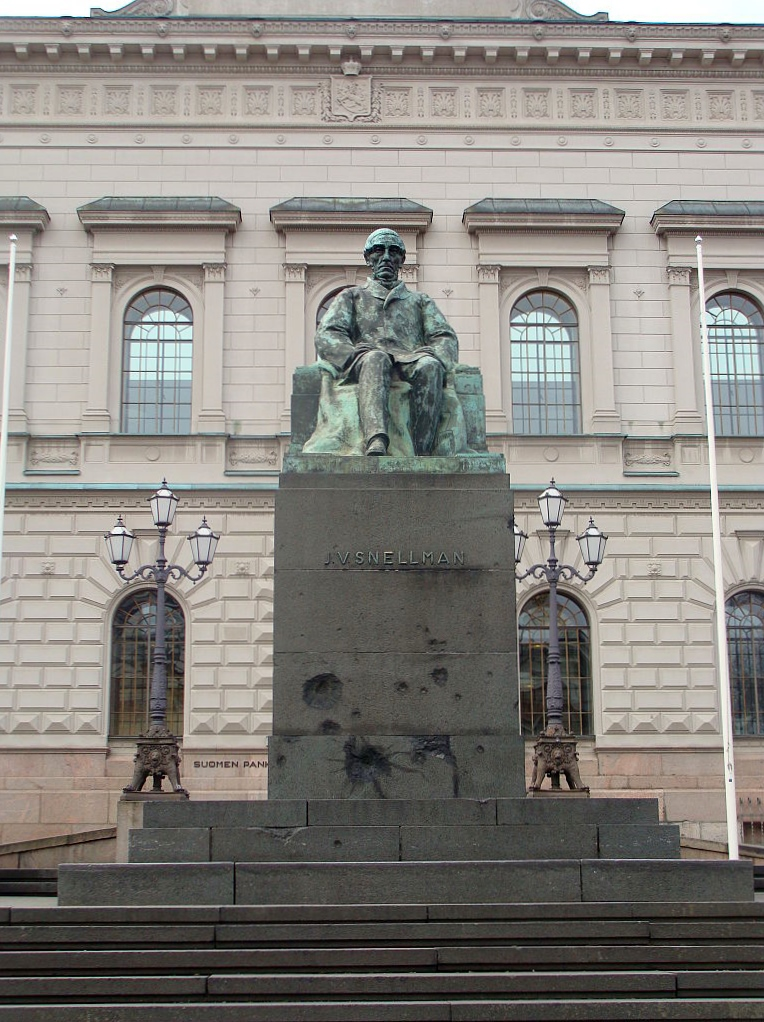
Monument to Johan Vilhelm Snellman in front of the Bank of Finland, 1923
(Note: Damaged in the bombings of the Continuation War, kept as it is.)

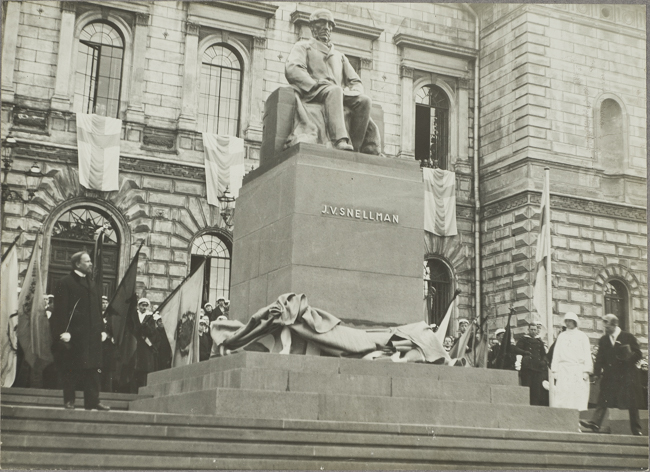
The unveiling of the statue of Snellman in 1923
(in fact already completed in 1916) (fi)

== See also ==
- Golden Age of Finnish Art
- Finnish art
