= Elias Lönnrot (monument) =

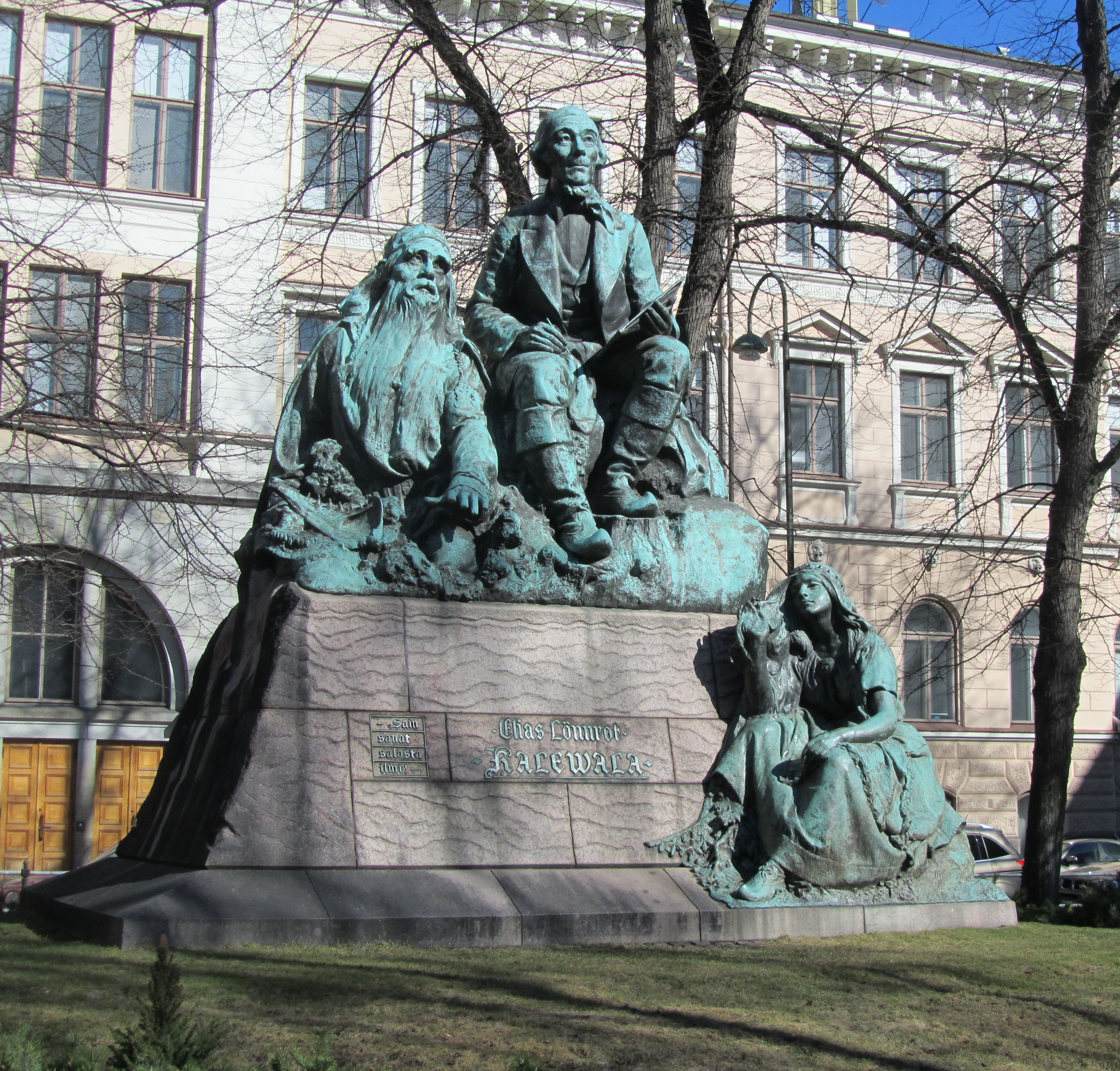
- Artist: Emil Wikström
- Year: 1902
- Medium: Bronze sculpture
- Subject: Finnish philologist and folk collector
- Location: Lönnrotinkatu 5–7, Helsinki, Finland; 60°10′00″N 24°56′20″E

Elias Lönnrot is a monument in Helsinki, the capital of Finland, by a Finnish sculptor Emil Wikström, unveiled in 1902.

The bronze and granite monument is situated in the Southern Helsinki Kamppi neighborhood on Lönnrotinkatu street, in front of Ressun lukio in small Lönnrot's Park.

== History ==
In 1899 Emil Wikström won the contest held by the Finnish Literature Society to design a sculpture of the Finnish folklore collector Elias Lönnrot. The final version differed considerably from the original design. It was influenced by the sculpture of Eemil Halonen, who placed second in the contest. The monument was unveiled on the night of October 18, 1902. The monument is currently the part of the Helsinki Art Museum collection.

== Description ==
The monument depicts realistic figure of Lönnrot, writing down the songs, with two epic figures, Väinämöinen, hero-god from the national epic Kalevala, and mythic maiden Impi from the folklore collection Kanteletar. Väinämöinen rises from the mouth of a giant Antero Vipunen, carved on the right side of the granite pedestal. Antero Vipunen has a pentagram on the forehead, symbolizing his divine protection and magic power. Next to Lönnrot's name the front of the pedestal contains the words from Kalevala, poem 17: "Sain sanat salasta ilmi", which was translated by John Martin Crawford (1888) as "Hidden deep for many ages, learned the words of ancient wisdom".

The context comes from the songs 16, 17 and 18 of the Finnish national epic Kalevala. Väinämöinen intends to obtain missing magic spells. A giant Antero Vipunen, buried with head emerging from the ground, swallows him. Väinämöinen fights to escape. Finally released from the mouth, Väinämöinen obtains new spells. The words on the pedestal refer to this event, as well as the collection work of Lönnrot.
