= Nikolai Tirkkonen =

Finnish merchant (1875–1926)

Frans Nikolai Tirkkonen
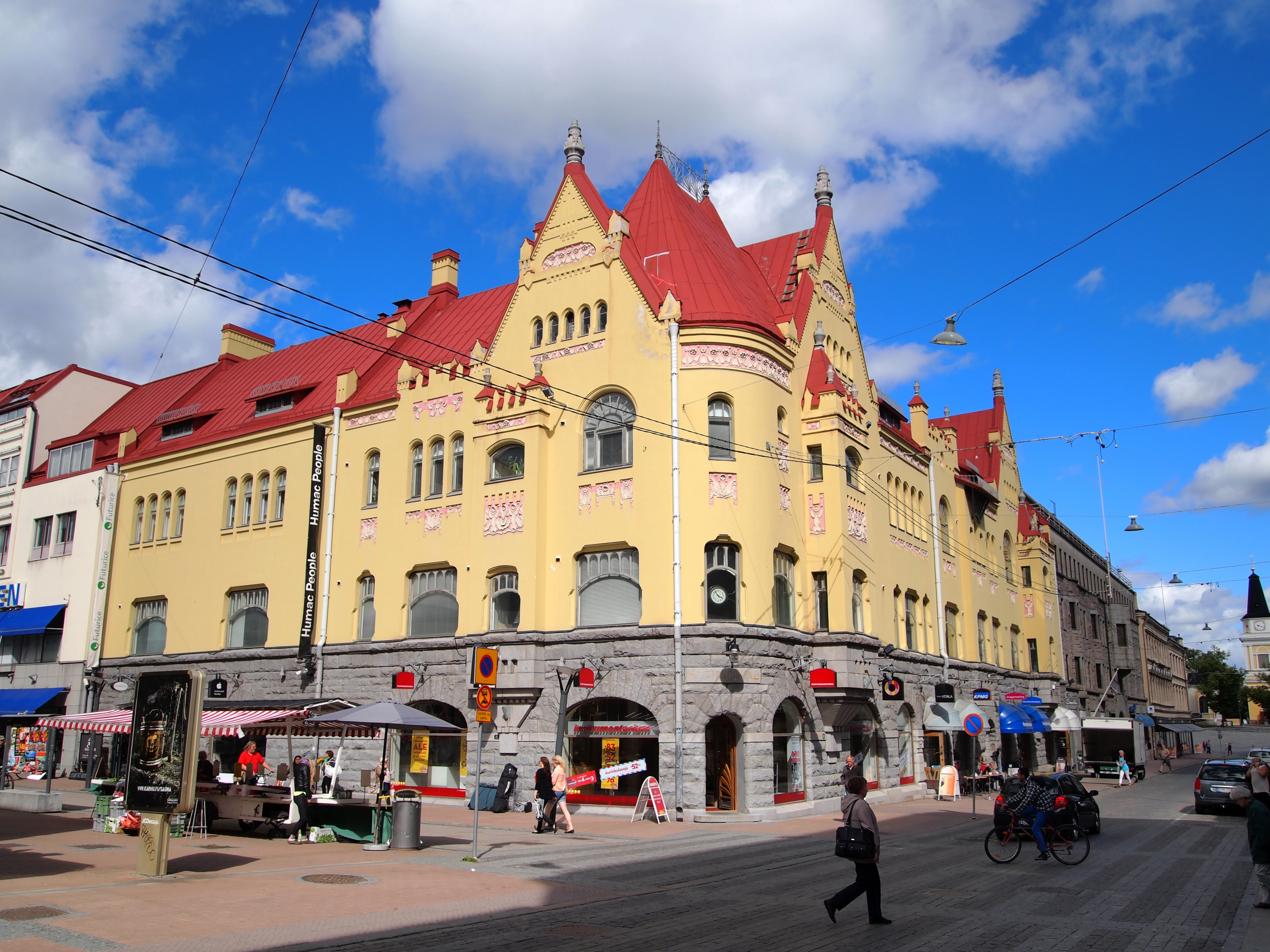
- The Tirkkonen House in Tampere, designed by Lars Sonck and Birger Federley.
- Born: 5 April 1875; Tampere, Finland
- Died: 17 December 1926 (aged 51); Tampere, Finland
- Occupation: Merchant
- Years active: 1890s–1926
- Known for: Pioneering innovations in retail and philanthropy; Introduction of mail-order sales in Finland; Founding of the Tirkkonen House
- Spouse: Fanny Maria Törnudd
- Children: 2
- Awards: Appointed Commercial Counselor (1919)

Frans Nikolai Tirkkonen (5 April 1875 – 17 December 1926) was a Finnish merchant and Commercial Counselor (1919).

Tirkkonen owned the textile, yarn, and fashion goods store "J. Tirkkonen" in Tampere, which his parents, who began their careers as market vendors, had founded in 1869.

== Childhood and youth ==
Nikolai Tirkkonen's father was Johan (Juhana) (b. April 28, 1841, Joroinen; d. October 10, 1892, Tampere), and his mother was Hedvig Maria (b. December 19, 1842, Tyrvää; d. January 2, 1919, Tampere). In 1869, his parents became itinerant merchants, traveling through Savo and Central Finland with horse-drawn wagons. Their trade flourished, and within a few years, they purchased a market stall at the edge of Tampere's Central Square in the Pillar Shops. In the same year Nikolai was born, they moved their thriving textile and yarn shop to a wooden building at 6 Kauppakatu.

A year after his father's death, Nikolai Tirkkonen went abroad to Berlin, London, and Paris to train as a merchant. His widowed mother, Maria Tirkkonen, continued to manage the store.

== Tirkkonen House and business expansion ==
After returning to Finland, Nikolai Tirkkonen resumed the business alongside his mother. In 1901, the old wooden shop building was replaced with the Art Nouveau-style, three-story Tirkkonen House at the corner of Kuninkaankatu and Kauppakatu. The building was designed by architects Lars Sonck and Birger Federley.

The building was expanded in 1906 along Kuninkaankatu. At that time, an innovation was introduced: an internal pneumatic tube system imported from England. This air-pressure system transported receipts and money from 13 different departments to the main cashier, which returned change and receipts. The Tirkkonen store also operated Tampere's first delivery truck, purchased in 1910.

Nikolai Tirkkonen managed the fabric shop, which, inspired by a Berlin model, was spread over two floors. His mother Maria oversaw the yarn department. Both lived in the building's third floor.

Nikolai Tirkkonen also began offering mail-order sales for his store's products, an idea he had borrowed from abroad. In 1903, the first Tirkkosen Muotijournaali (Tirkkonen's Fashion Journal) was published, featuring fabrics and undergarments.

== Näsikallio Fountain ==
In 1909, on the 40th anniversary of J. Tirkkonen's business, Nikolai Tirkkonen donated funds to the City of Tampere for a fountain. The funds were used to construct the large Näsikallio Fountain, completed in 1913 on the southern slope of Mustanlahti Hill at the north end of Hämeenpuisto. The fountain's three bronze sculptures were created by sculptor Emil Wikström, and the granite structures were designed by architect Birger Federley.

== Family ==
Nikolai Tirkkonen was married to Fanny Maria Törnudd (b. November 17, 1876, Ilmajoki). The couple had two children: Tauno Juhani Uolevi (b. August 2, 1898) and Erkki Juhani (b. May 27, 1901).

== Sources ==
- Rauhamäen rusthollista Tirkkolan kievariin. Antonius Tirkkonen's descendants from the late 1600s to the early 1900s. Tirkkosen Sukuseura ry, Jyväskylä 2010.
- Tampere's Public Sculptures and Monuments. Tampere City / Tampere Museum of Contemporary Art, Tampere 2006.
