= Dora Wahlroos =

Finnish painter (1870–1947)

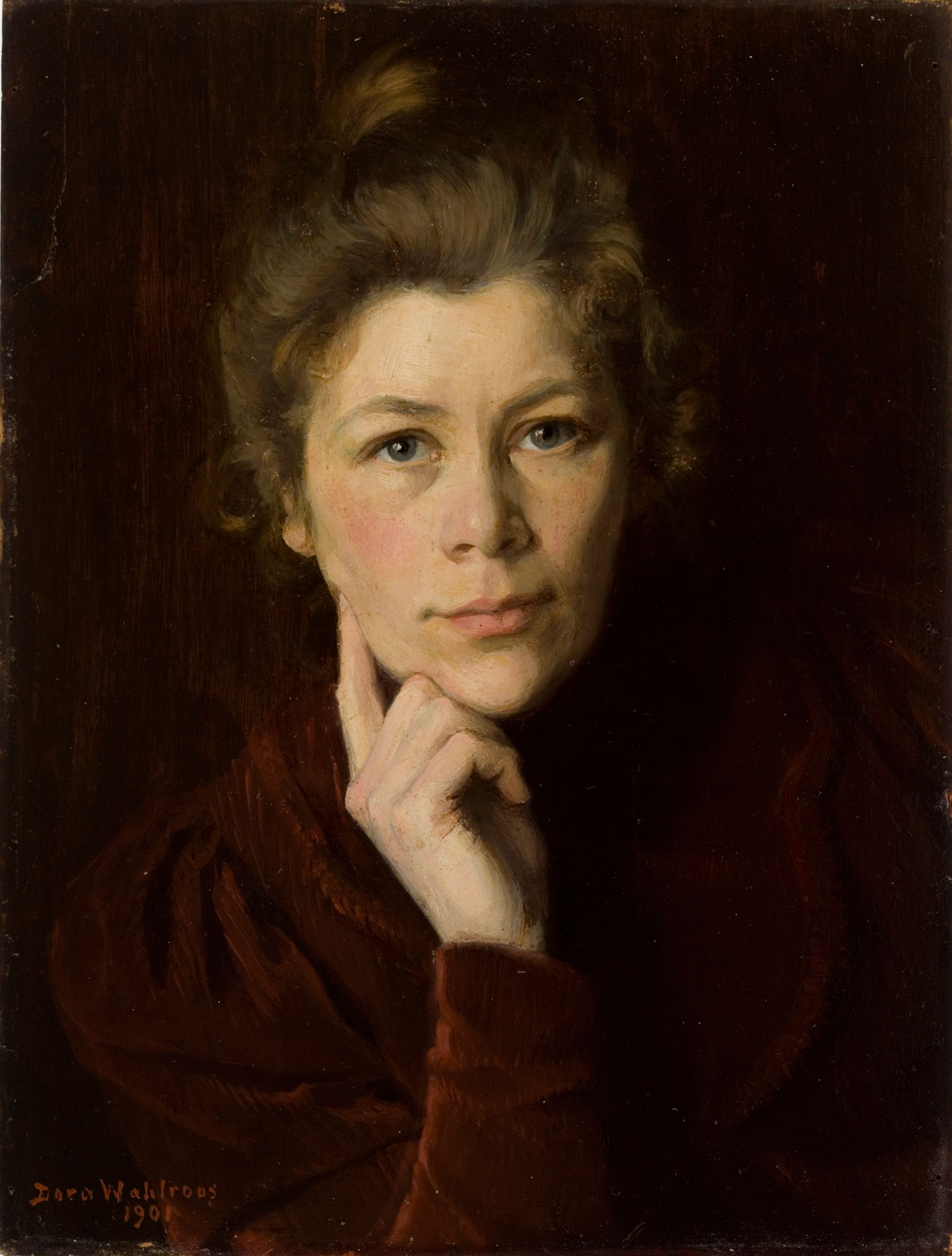
- Self-Portrait, 1901
- Born: Anna Dorothée Wahlroos; 19 December 1870; Pori, Grand Duchy of Finland, Russian Empire (now Finland)
- Died: 21 March 1947 (aged 76); Kauniainen, Finland
- Known for: Painting
- Movement: en plein air

Anna Dorothée (Dora) Wahlroos (19 December 1870 Pori – 21 March 1947 Kauniainen) was a Finnish painter who participated in the painting movement en plein air towards the end of the 19th century.

== Biography ==
She was born in Pori to province land surveyor Johan Henrik Wahlroos and Dorothée Augusta Henrietta Fehn. She studied at the Turku Drawing School in 1886–1888 and under Victor Westerholm in 1889–1890. She was one of the artists who joined Westerholm in the artists colony at Önningeby on the island of Åland.

She was accepted to the Finnish Art Society in 1890–1891, where her class was taught by Gunnar Berndtson. In the Fall of 1890 she got engaged to sculptor Emil Wikström. The two went to study together at Paris in 1891–1892. She won third prize in a competition with By the wash basin in 1893 and the same year she was granted a stipend. In Spring 1895 she was back at Paris and completed Inspiration there. However, by this point she had separated with Wikström, who married her friend Alice Högström in 1895. In the late 1890s she painted a number of paintings of local Finnish sceneries and she also did altar paintings.

In August 1900 she traveled to Paris for the 1900 Paris Expedition, and from there she headed to the village of Antignano in Livorno, Italy, where Elin Danielson-Gambogi was living with her husband Raffaello Gambogi. It turned into a slight misadventure for her as Raffaello fell deeply in love with her. She returned to Finland and sent back the letters he had sent unopened. She became less outward after this, spending more time with her family first in Turku and then in Kauniainen, where they bought a villa. Still, her use of color changed after the trip, becoming more vibrant. She is known to have admired to strong use of color by Raffaello.

She studied more at München in 1911. Although she painted her entire life even until the end, her later works didn't get as much recognition. She died in 1947 from complications following an accident.

== Works ==
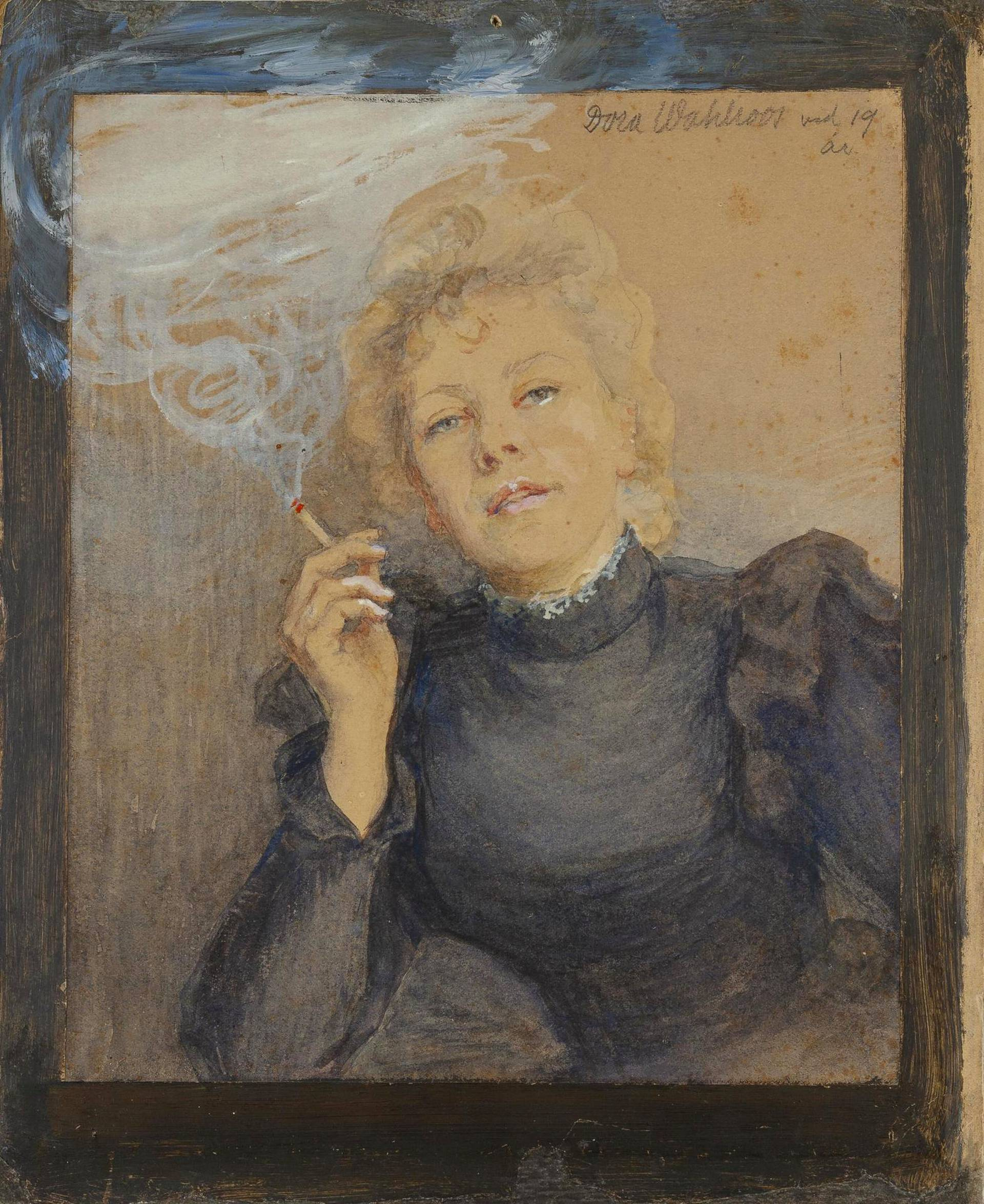
Self-Portrait, 1889

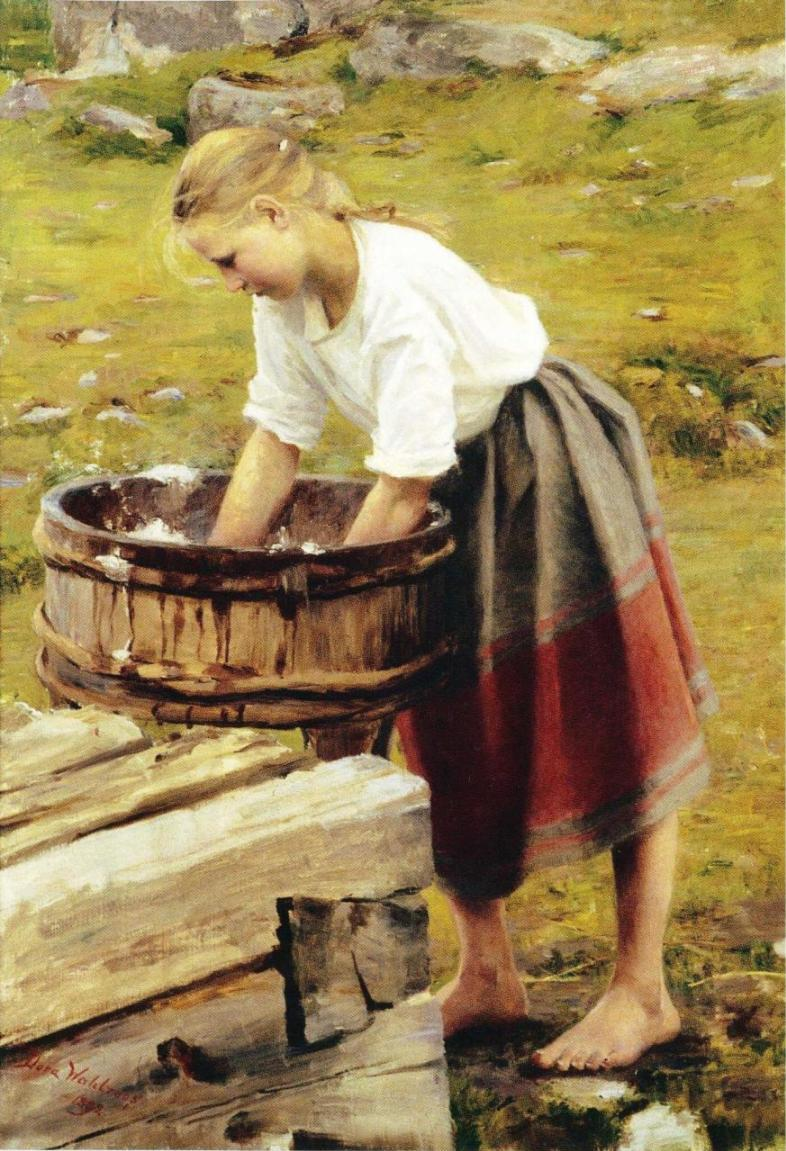
By the wash basin, 1892

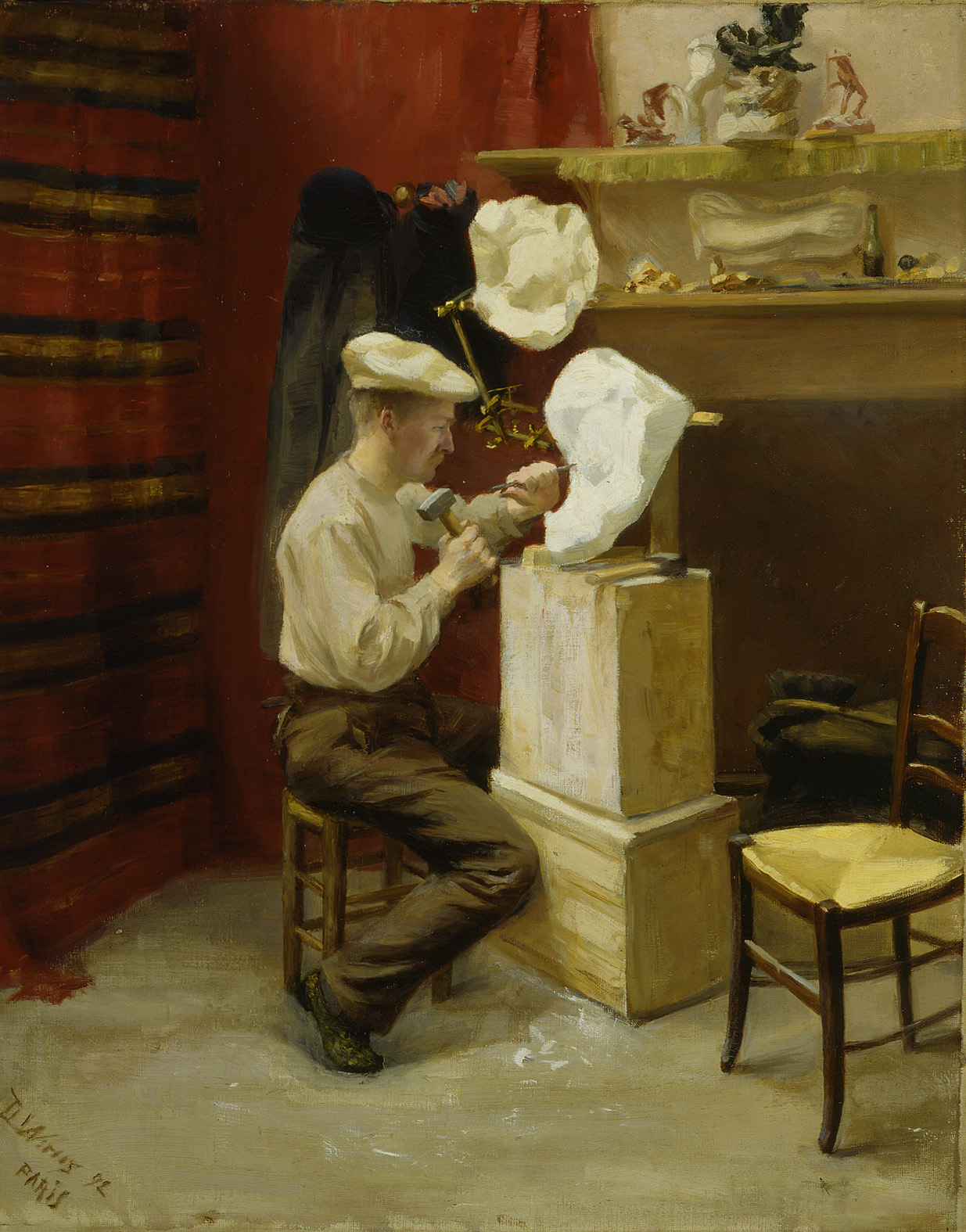
Emil Wikström in His Studio in Paris, 1892

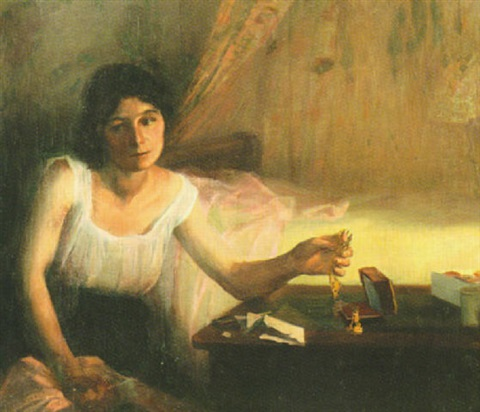
Longing, 1892

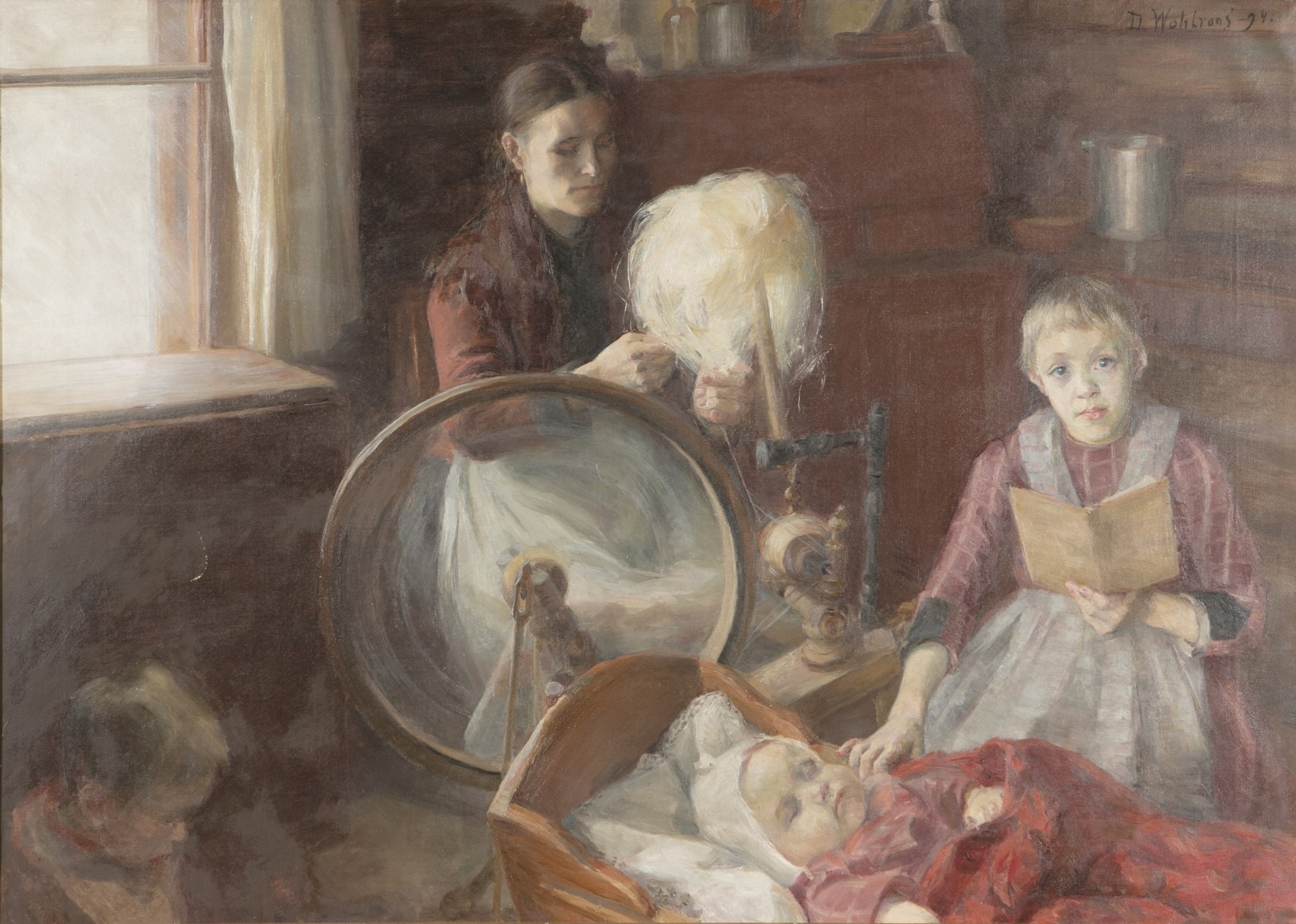
Mother and Children, 1894

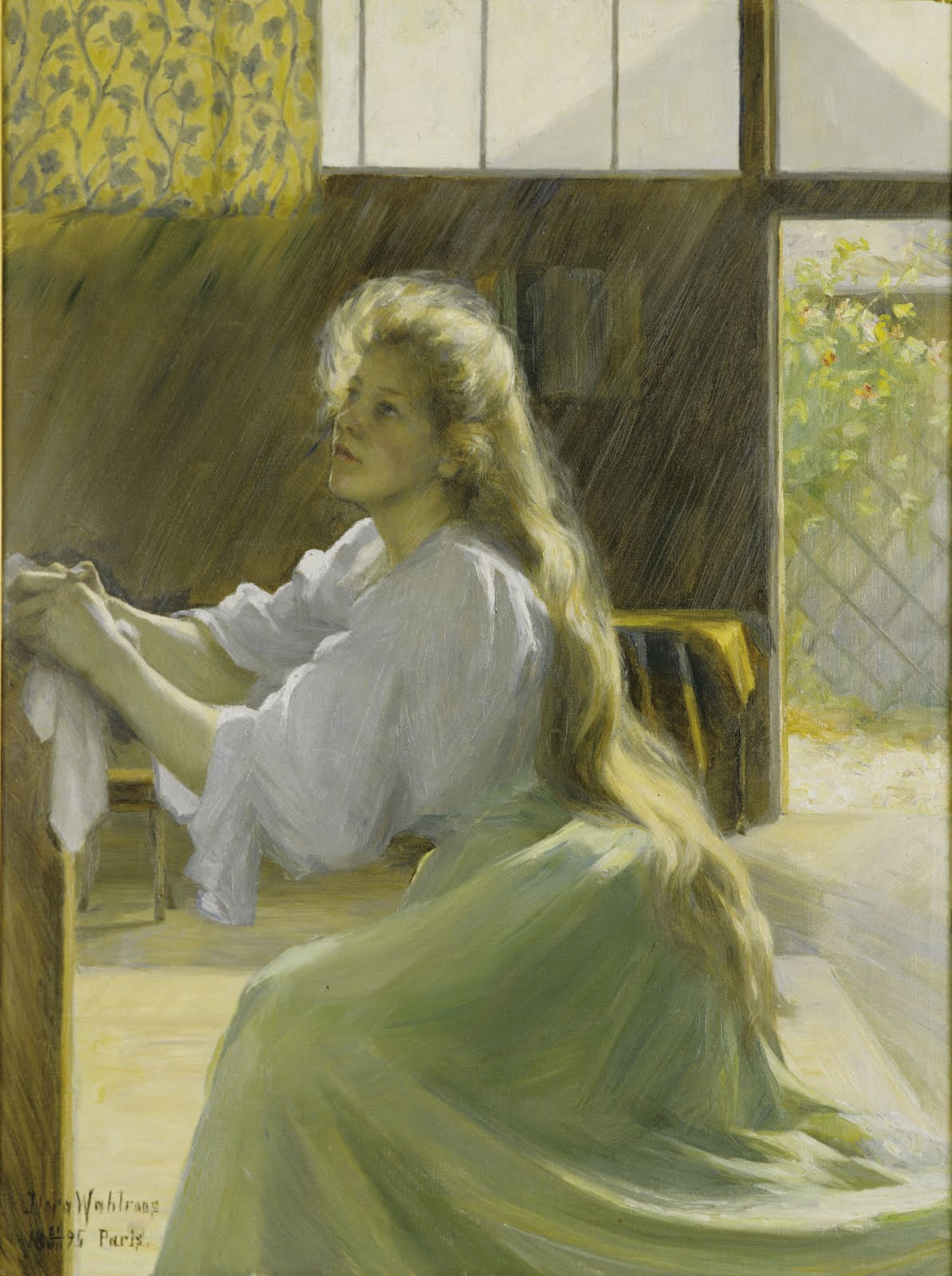
Inspiration, 1895, self-portrait

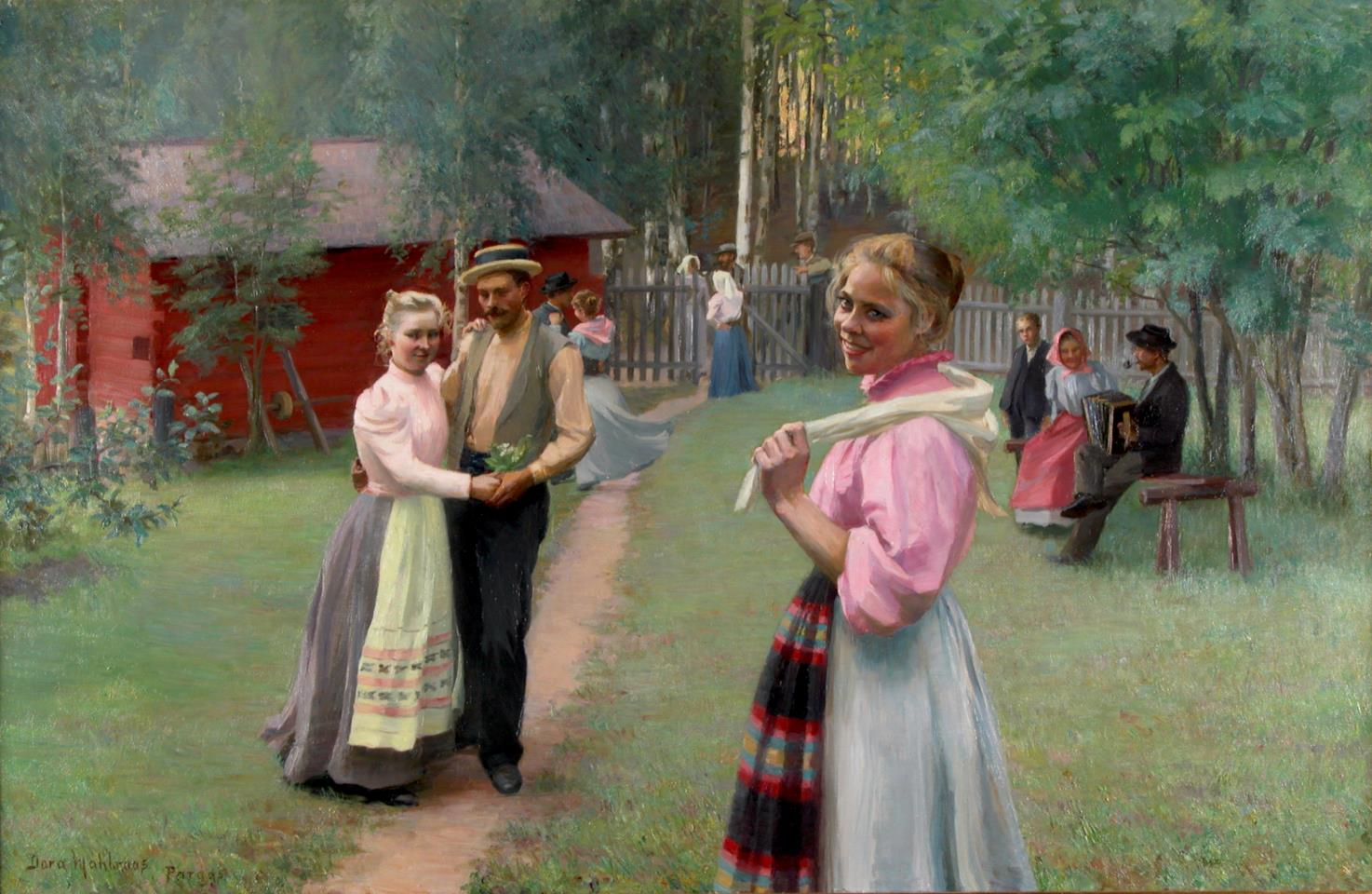
Evening at Pargas, 1898

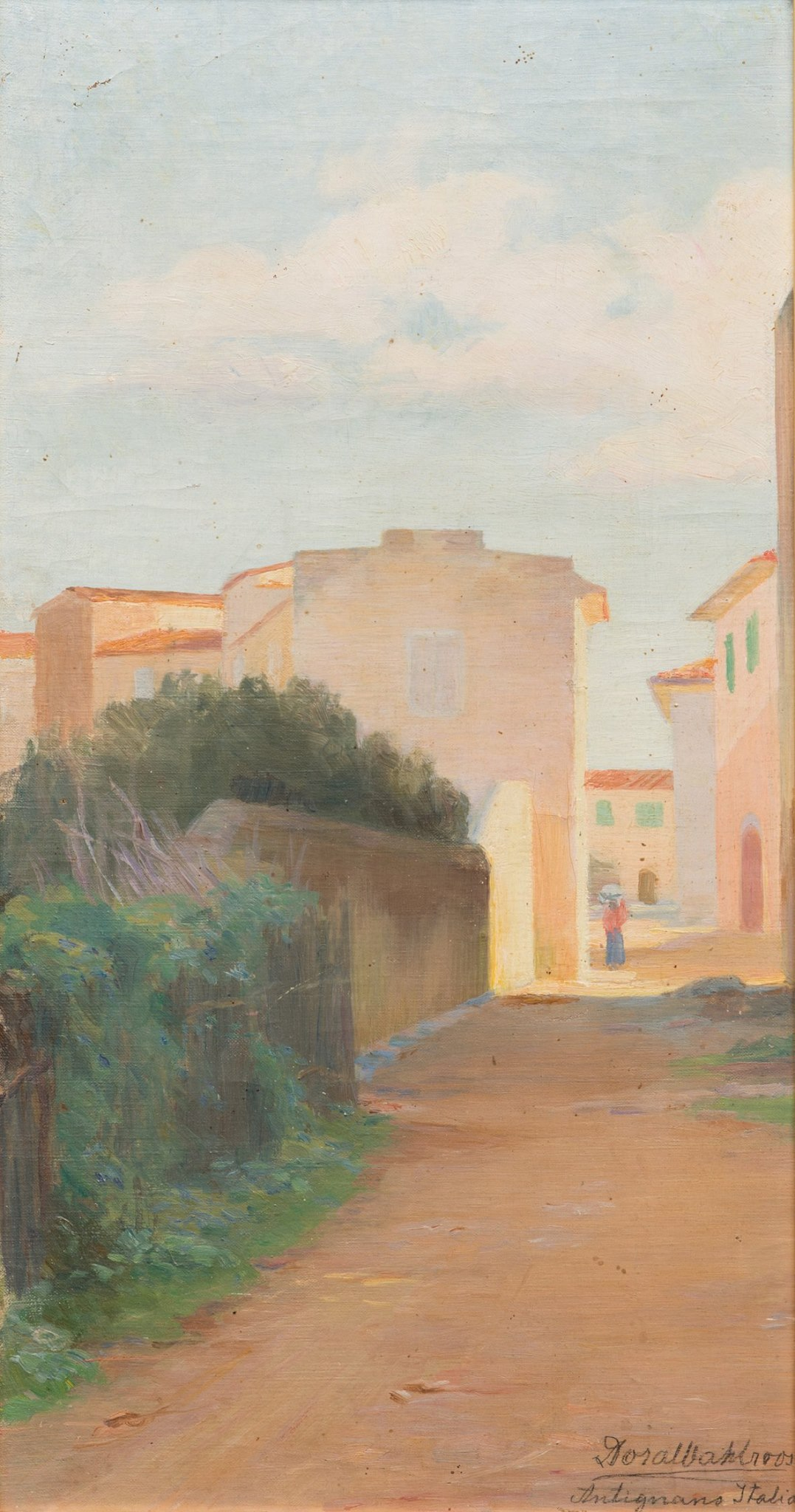
Motif from Italy

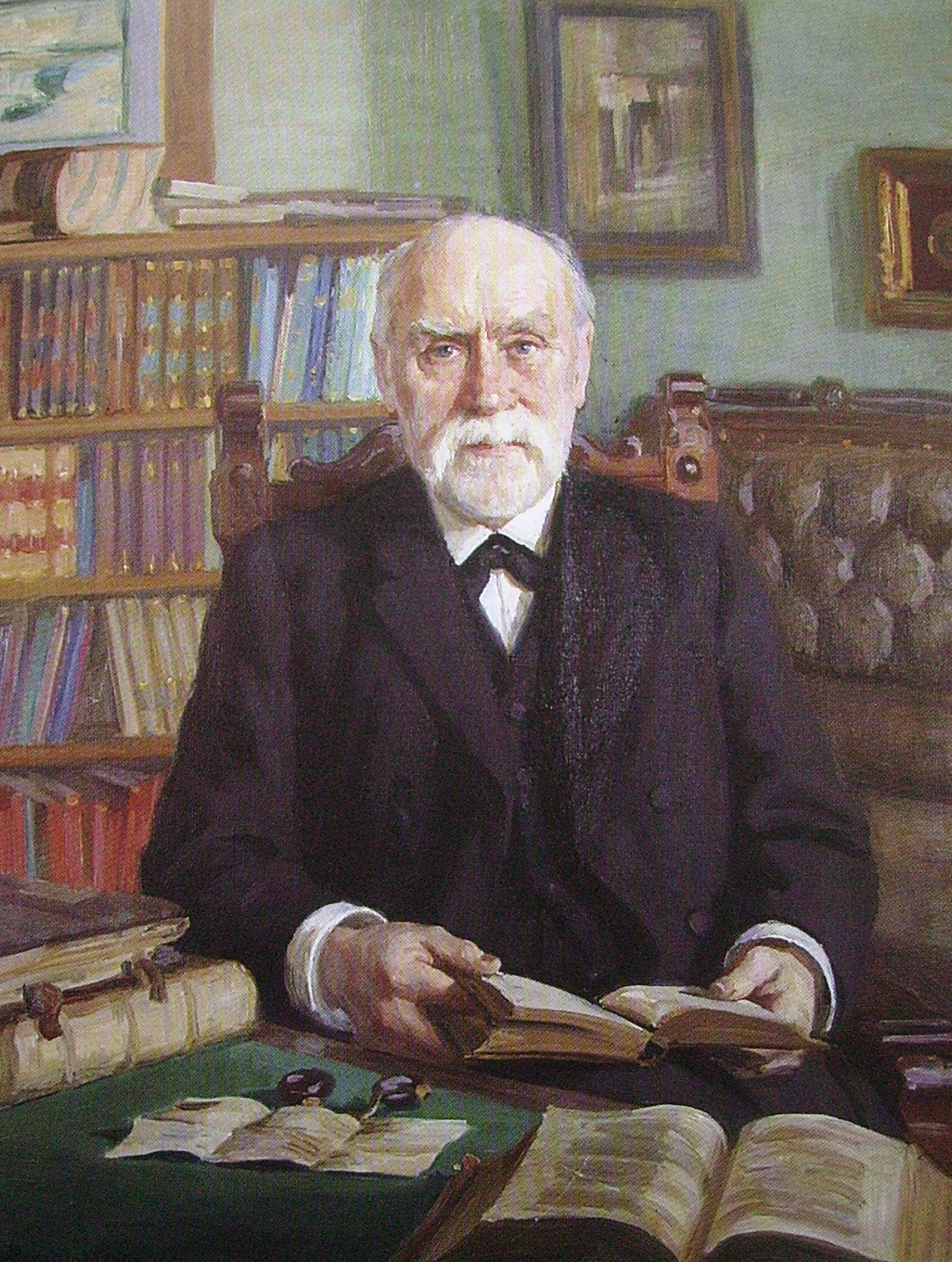
Portrait of Reinhold Hausen, 1913

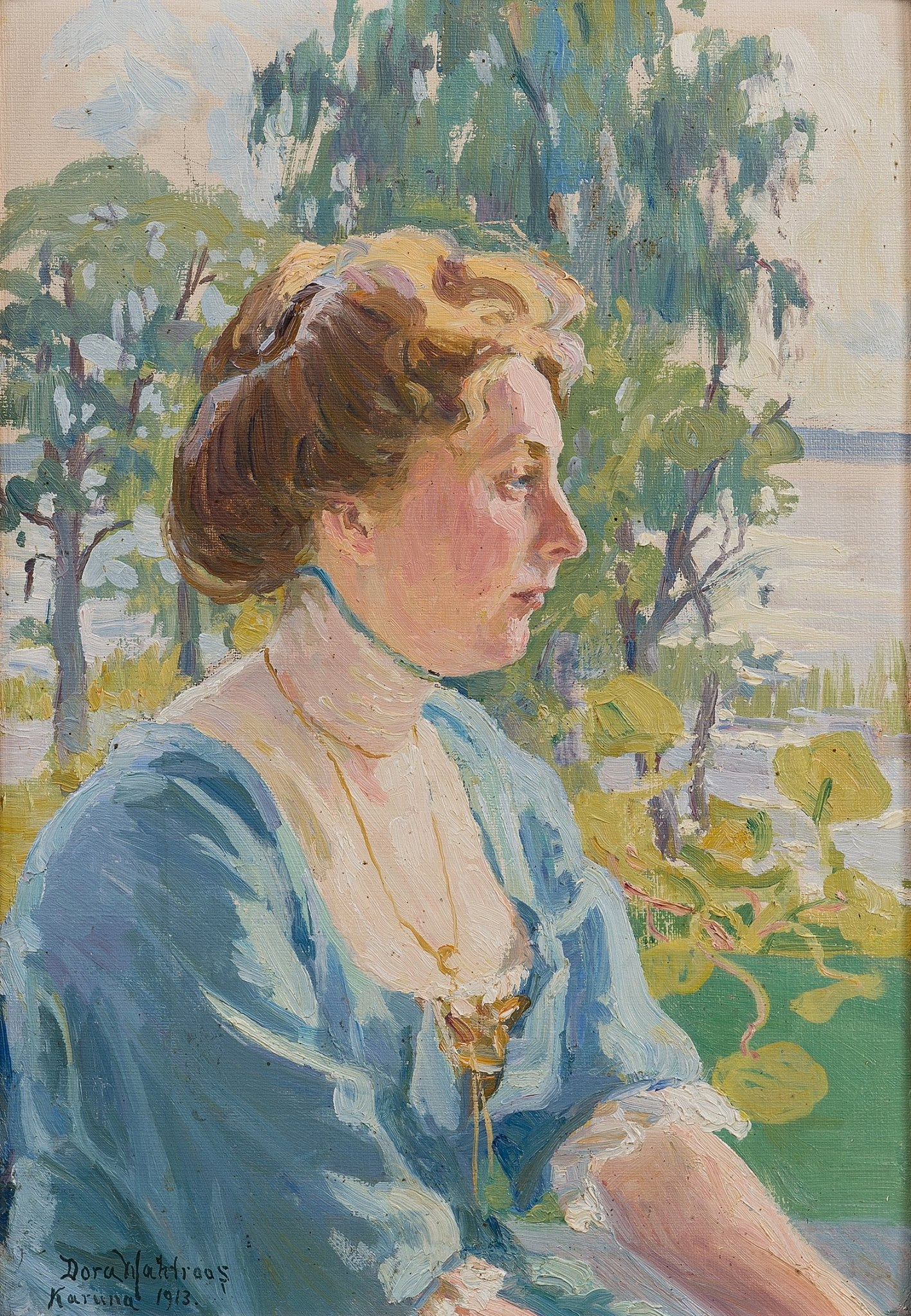
Portrait of a Lady, 1913

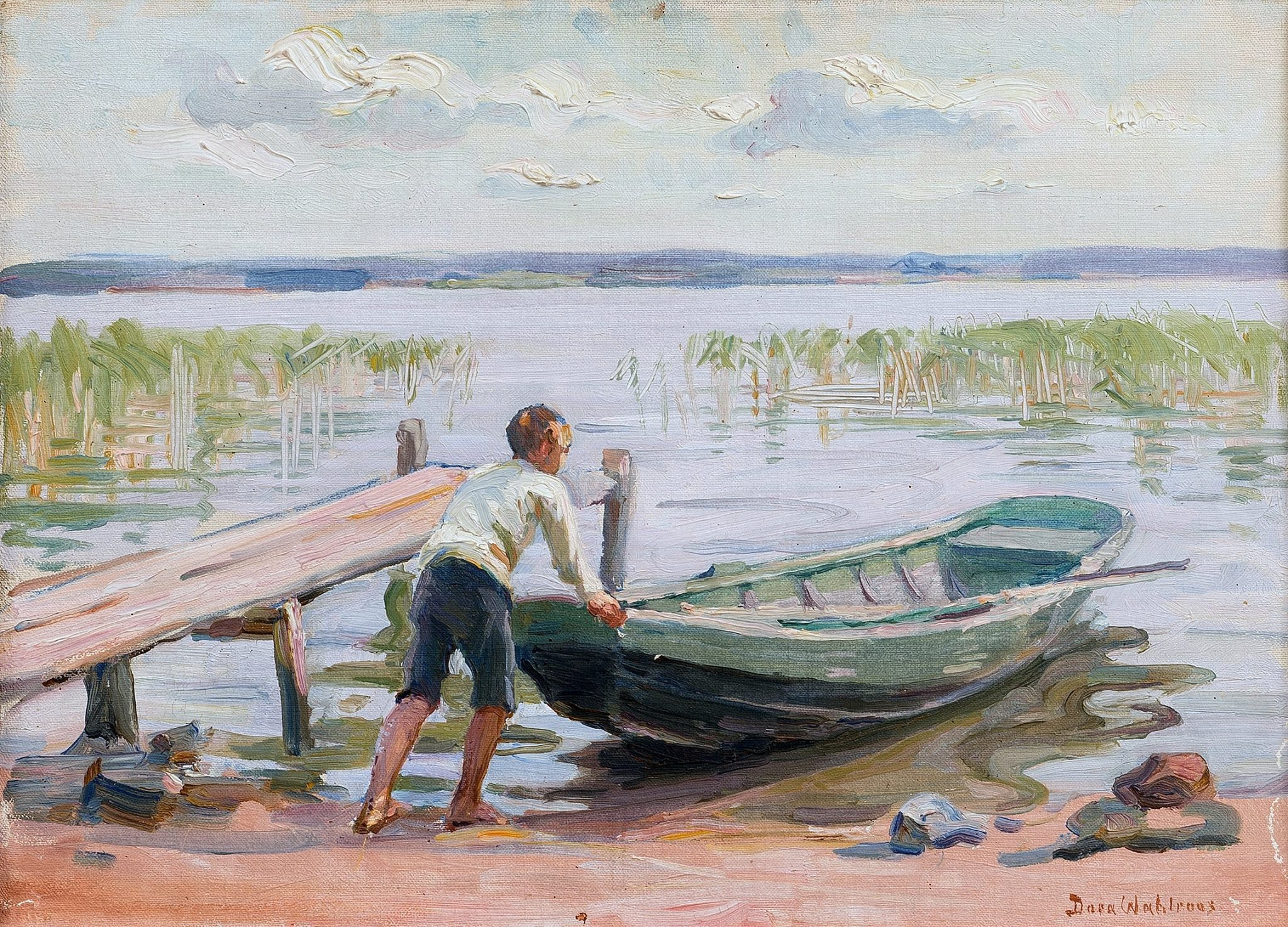
A Boy and a Boat by the Shore

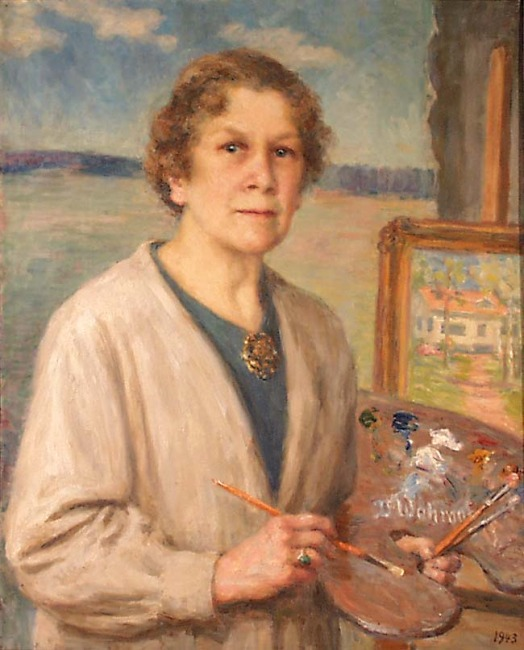
Self-Portrait, 1943

== See also ==
- Golden Age of Finnish Art
- Art in Finland
