= Gambogi =

Gambogi is a surname. Notable people with the surname include:

- Elin Danielson-Gambogi (1861–1919), Finnish painter
- Raffaello Gambogi (1874–1943), Italian painter
