= Elin Danielson-Gambogi =

Finnish painter (1861–1919)

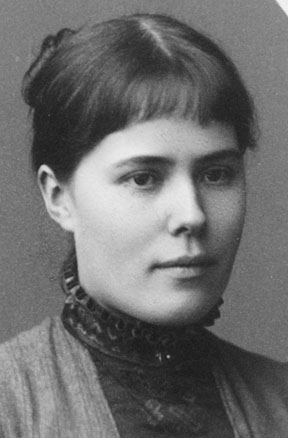
- Photographed in the 1880s
- Born: Elin Kleopatra Danielson; 3 September 1861; Noormarkku, Grand Duchy of Finland
- Died: 31 December 1919 (aged 58); Antignano, Italy
- Known for: Painting
- Movement: Naturalism (arts) and Realism
- Spouse: Raffaello Gambogi

Elin Kleopatra Danielson-Gambogi (née Danielson; 3 September 1861 – 31 December 1919) was a Finnish painter, best known for her realist works and portraits. Danielson-Gambogi was part of the first generation of Finnish women artists who received professional education in art, the so-called "painter sisters' generation". The group also included Helene Schjerfbeck (1862–1946), Helena Westermarck (1857-1938), and Maria Wiik (1853-1928).

== Biography ==
=== Early life and studies ===
Elin Danielson was born in the small village of Noormarkku, near the city of Pori in Western Finland. She was the first-born child of Karl Danielson and Rosa Amalia Danielson, who both came from families of officers and officials, a middle-class background. Her early years were spent on a family farm, Ala-Sihtola in Ilmajoki. Because of the Finnish famine of 1866–68, the farm failed and Karl Danielson went bankrupt. After being forced to sell the farm, her father committed suicide. Her mother, Rosa, returned to Noormarkku with her two daughters. Determined to provide a decent education for her daughters, Rosa worked in a variety of jobs. Following the tragedy, and surrounded by the strong female figures of her mother, aunt, and grandmother, Danielson adapted an independent survival strategy.

At the age of 15, Danielson moved to Helsinki and began studying in the Academy of Fine Arts, where her teachers included Carl Eneas Sjöstrand and Hjalmar Munsterhjelm. In 1878, Danielson started courses with Adolf von Becker.

=== Paris ===
In 1883 Danielson received a grant and moved to Paris. While there, she took lessons at the Académie Colarossi under Gustave Courtois and painted in Brittany during the summertime. A few years later she returned to Finland and lived with her relatives in Noormarkku and Pori. In 1888 she opened an atelier in Noormarkku. During the 1880s and 1890s she worked as a teacher in several art schools around Finland. She also attended the artists' colony Önningeby in Ålands.

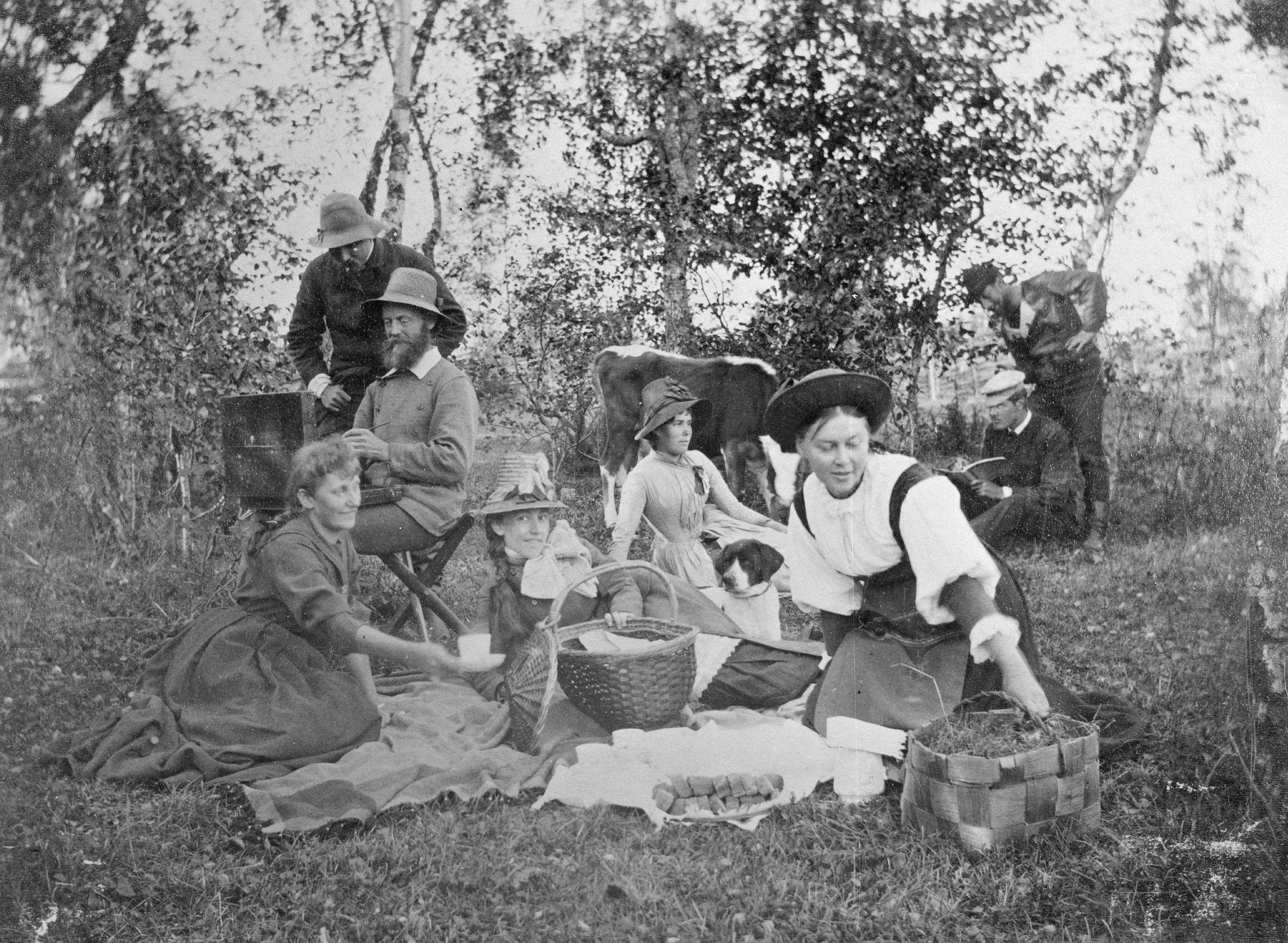
Artists at Önningeby in 1886. At the front, from left: Hanna Rönnberg, Hilma Westerholm, Elin Danielson and Nina Ahlstedt. Behind them, sitting in the chair, Fredrik Ahlstedt, and standing by him Victor Westerholm. Sitting on the ground at the back, Alex Federley, and standing behind him J. A. G. Acke.

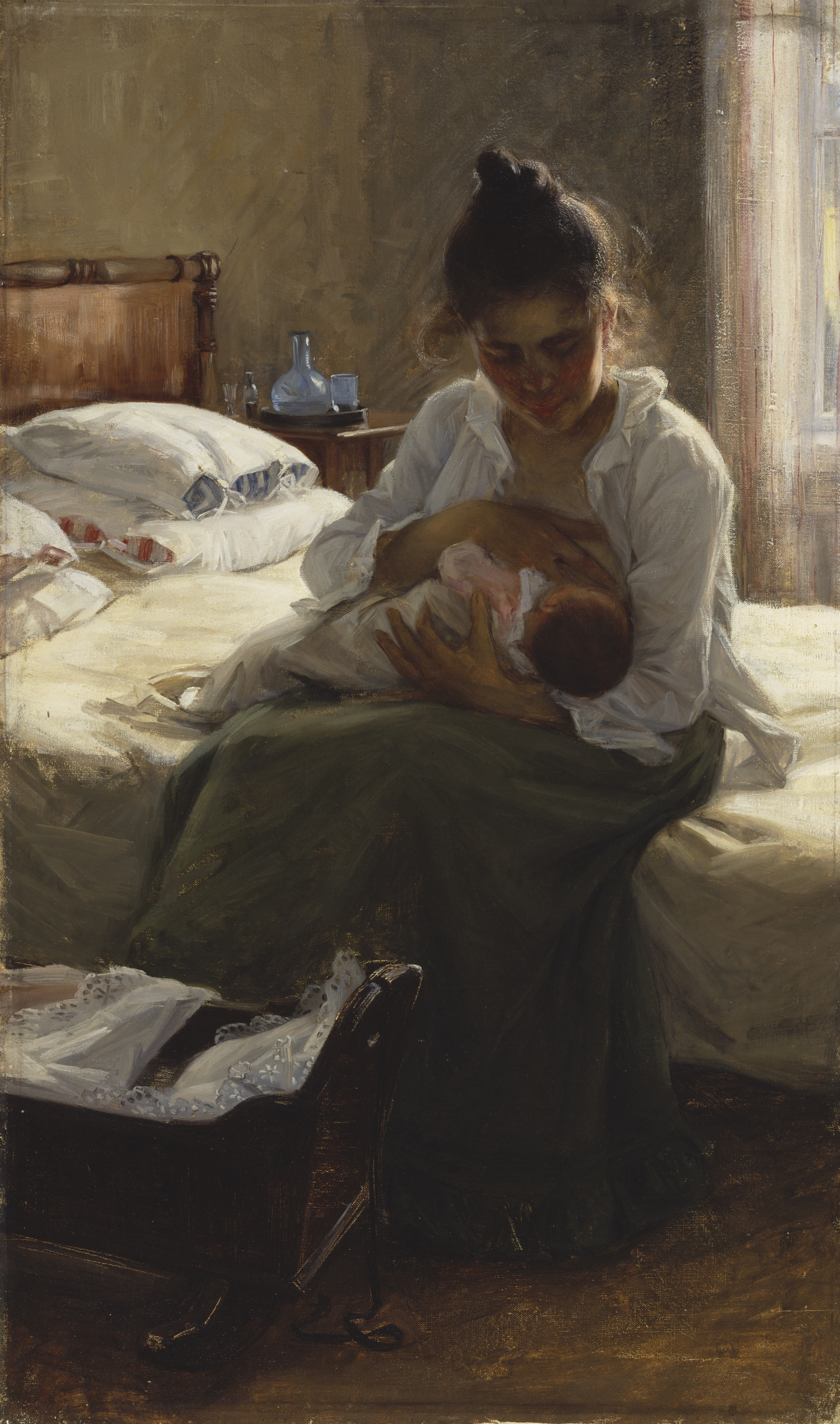
Mother, 1893, modeled by the artist's sister

=== Italy ===
In 1895, she received a scholarship and traveled to Florence, Italy. A year later she moved to the village of Antignano in Livorno where she met an Italian painter 13 years younger than herself, Raffaello Gambogi (1874–1943). They began working together and got married on February 27, 1898. They held exhibitions in Paris, Florence (where she was awarded an art prize by the city) and Milan, and in many Finnish cities, and their paintings were also included in the 1900 World's Fair in Paris, where she again won bronze medal. She also got to second place in the 1901 national portrait painting competition organized by the Finnish state. In 1899, King Umberto purchased a painting from her. That same year, she participated in the Venice Biennale.

Their marriage was strained when Raffaello had an affair with Danielson's Finnish friend Dora Wahlroos. While the affair quickly ended, it had a lasting impact on the Gambogis' marriage. She moved to Finland for a while, but returned in 1903. Because of World War I, her connection to her homeland was cut, and by the time she died, of pneumonia, at Antignano in 1919, she had been mostly forgotten in Finland.

== Legacy ==
Because of her choice of rare subject matters that often even caused some offence, Danielson is now seen as one of the central artists of the Golden Age of Finnish Art. Danielson-Gambogi was included in the 2018 exhibit Women in Paris 1850-1900.

== Works ==
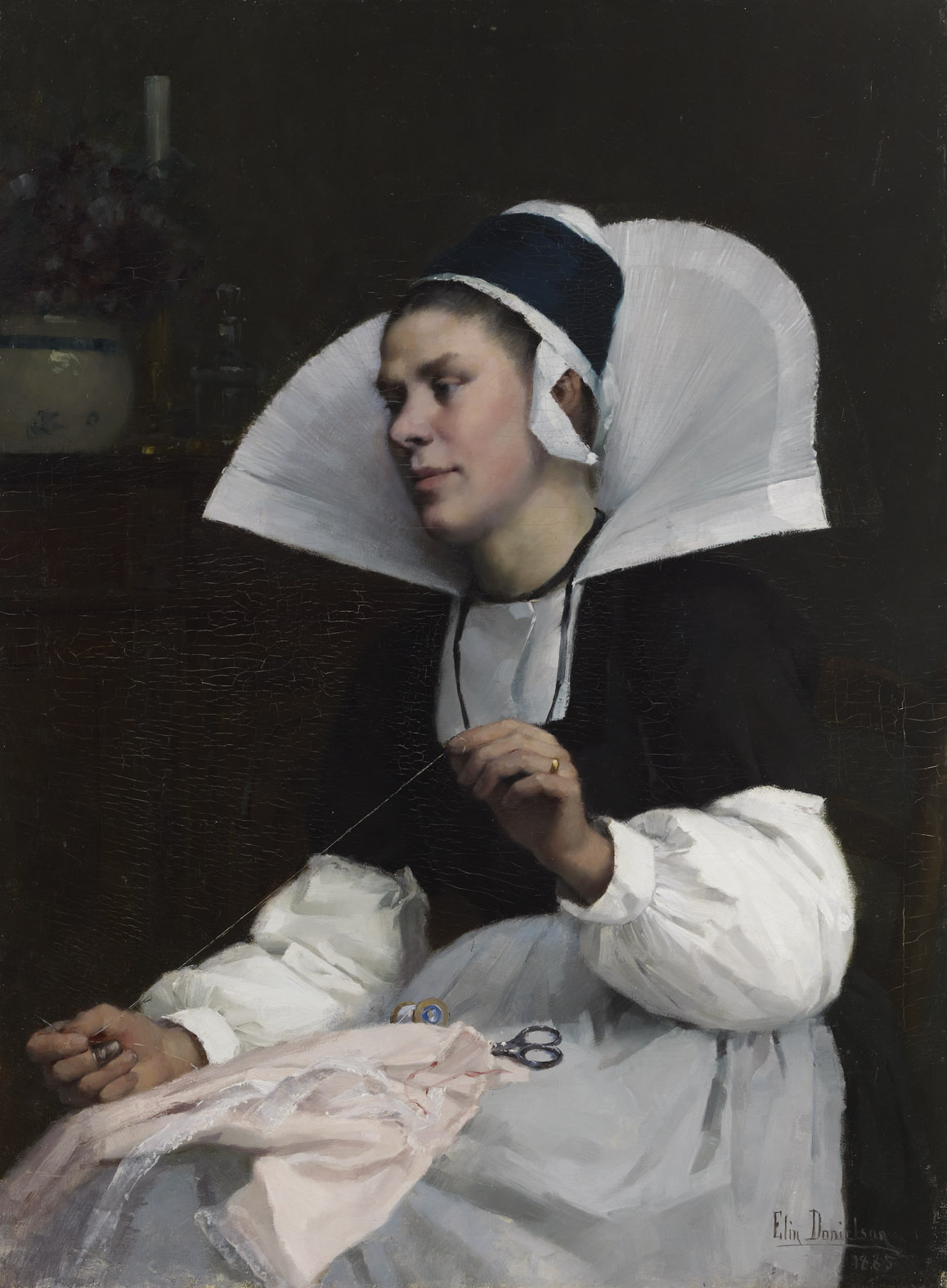
Young Mother (Girl from Brittany), 1885

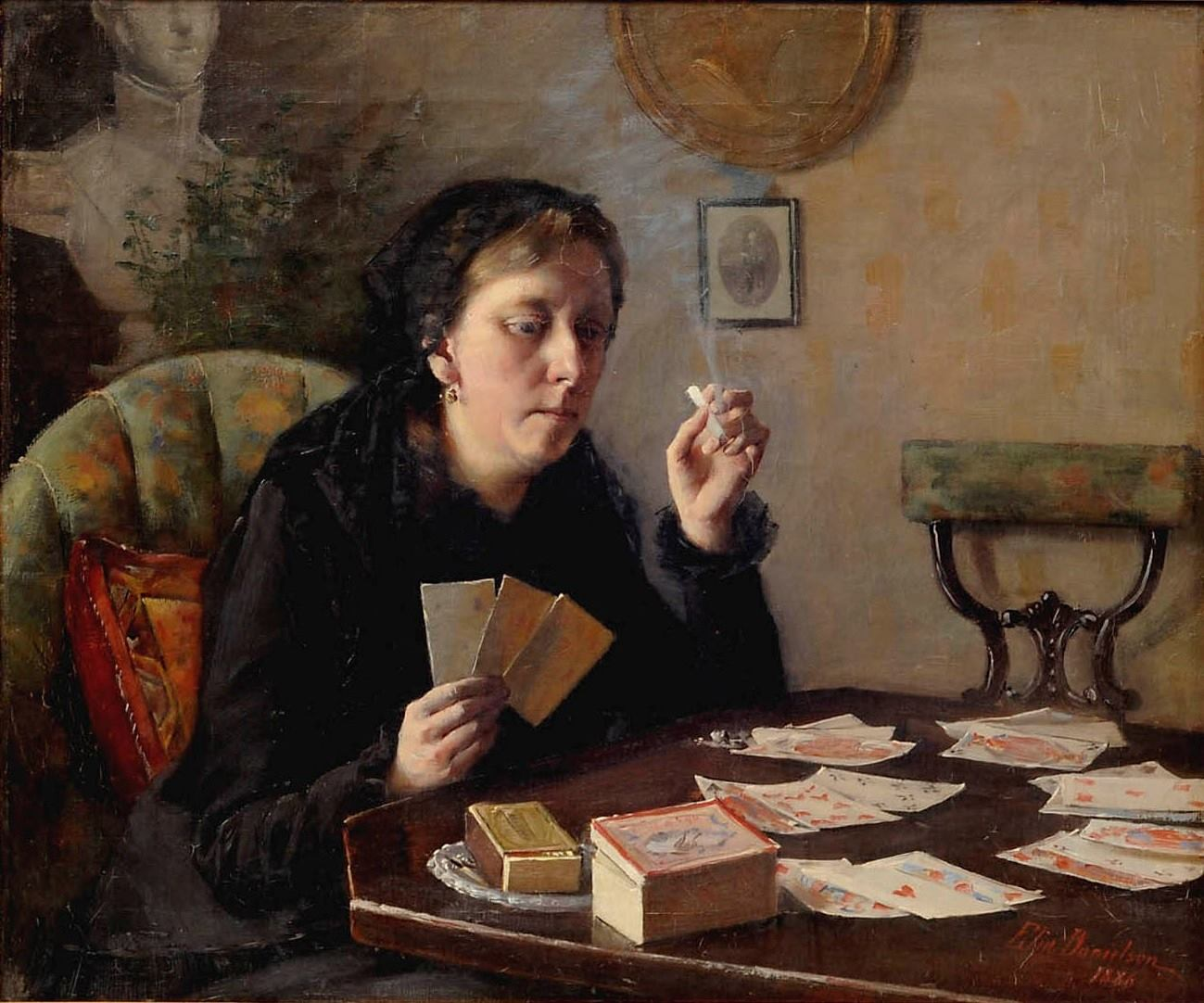
Aunt Balda's Pastime, 1886, one of her subjects that was criticized at the time

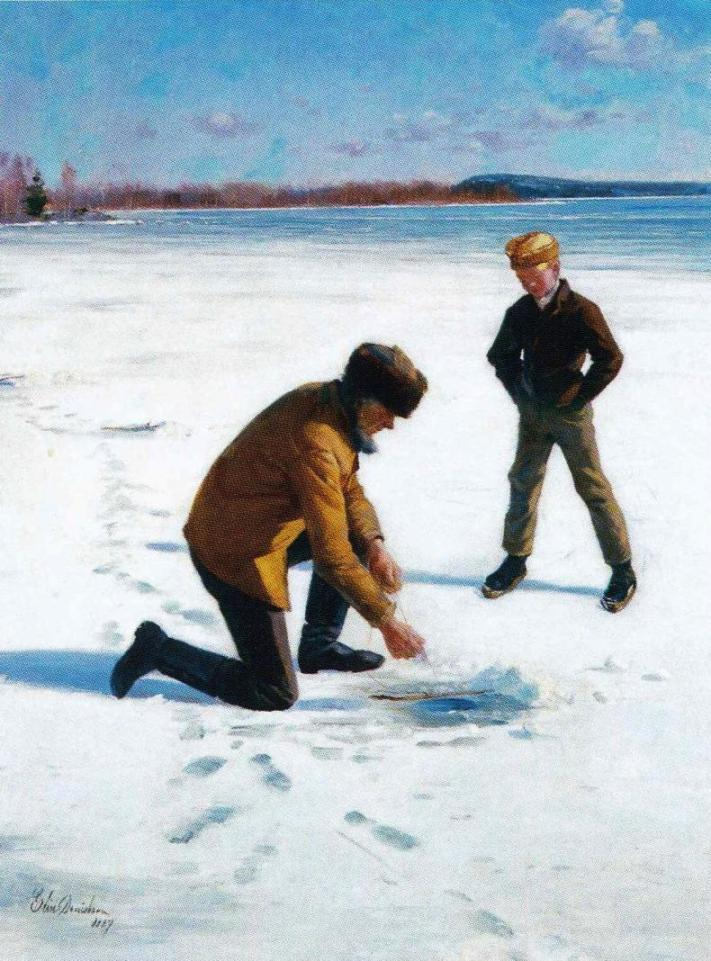
Winter Fishers, 1887

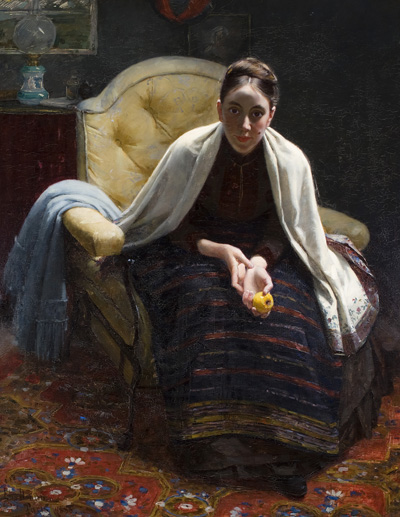
Portrait of Hilma Westerholm, 1888
(Note: It won a bronze medal at the Exposition Universelle of 1889.)

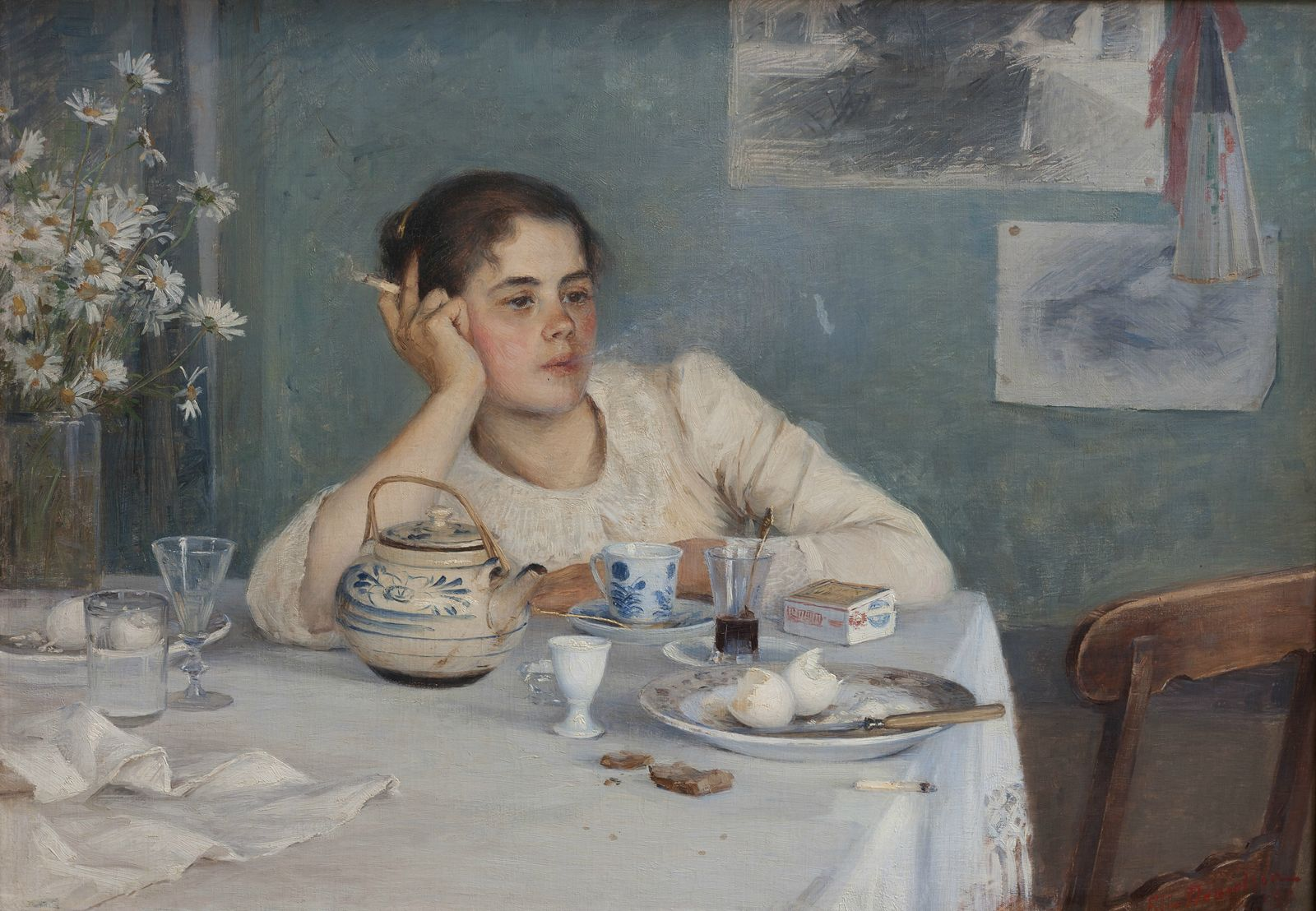
After Breakfast, 1890, of which the artist herself stated that it could have been left unpainted

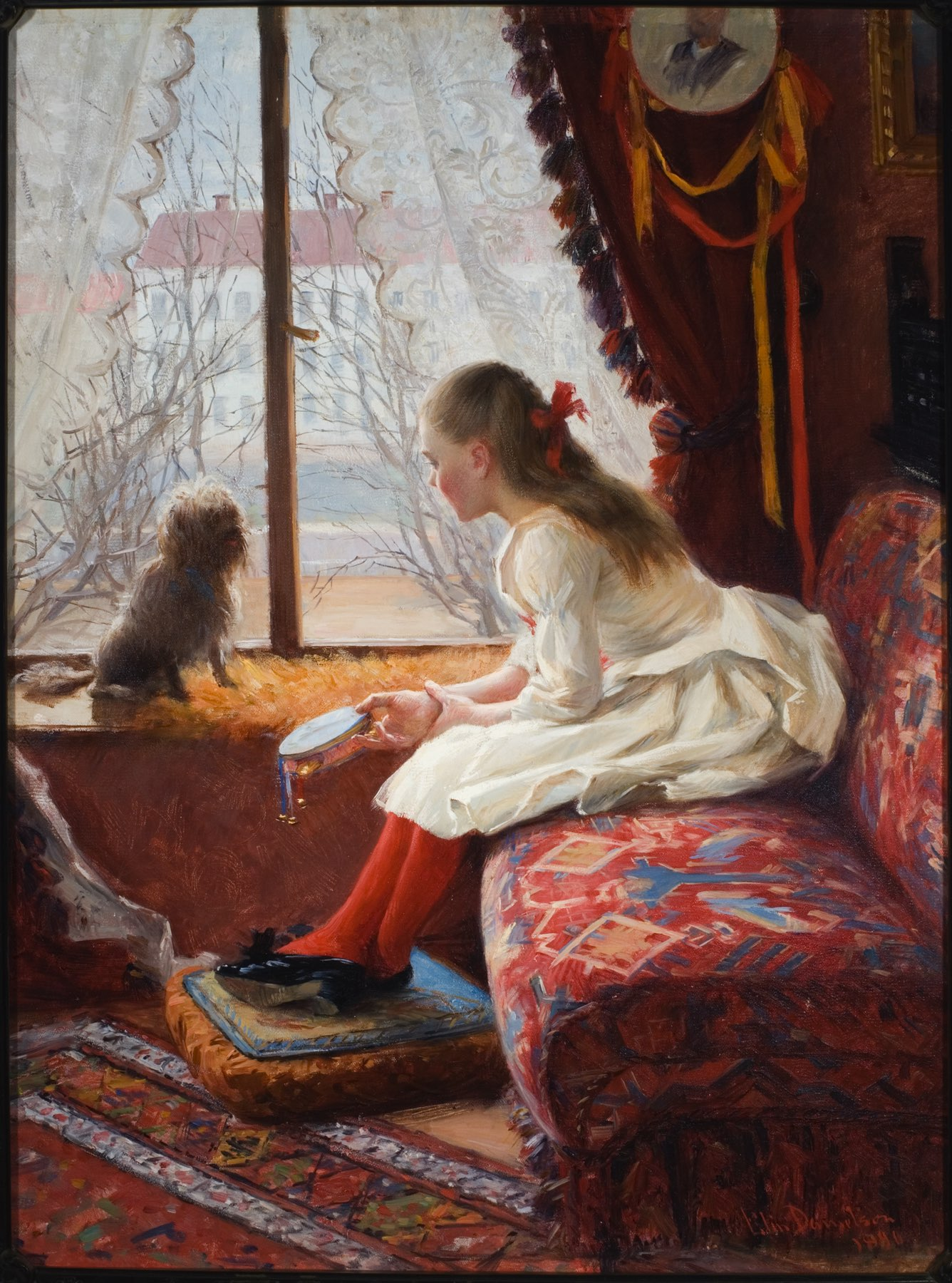
Walborg Jacobsson-Eager, 1890

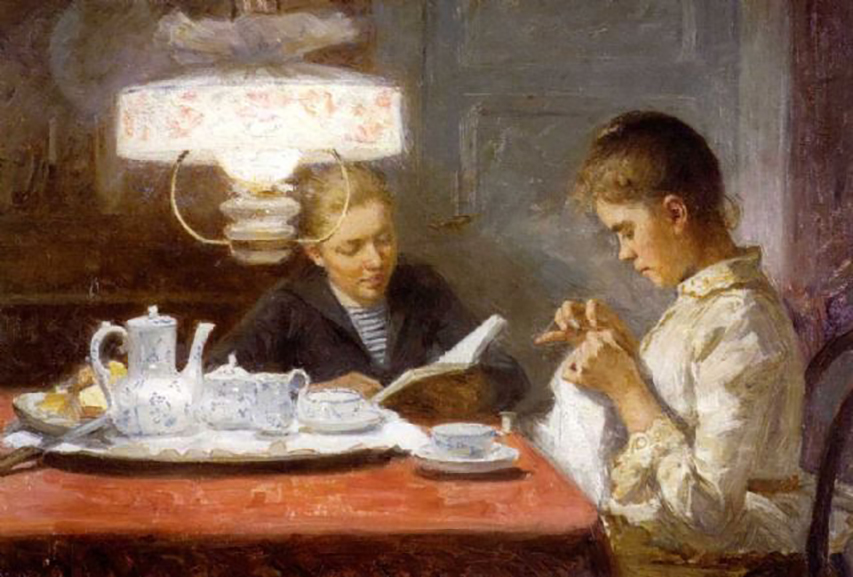
Sisters, 1891

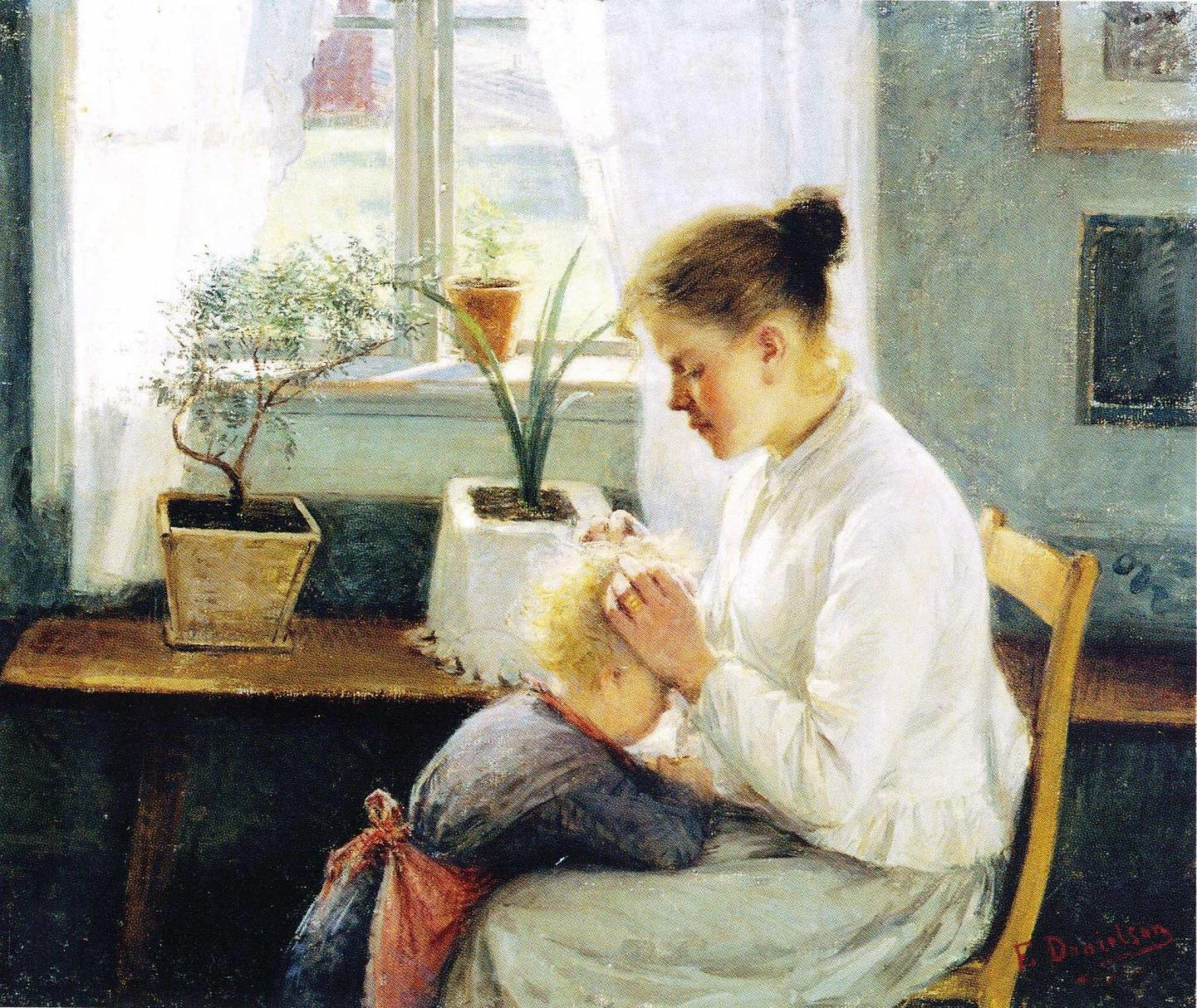
Mother's Care, 1891, the subject of a mother looking for head lice in her child's hair was disturbing to an art critic of Päivälehti

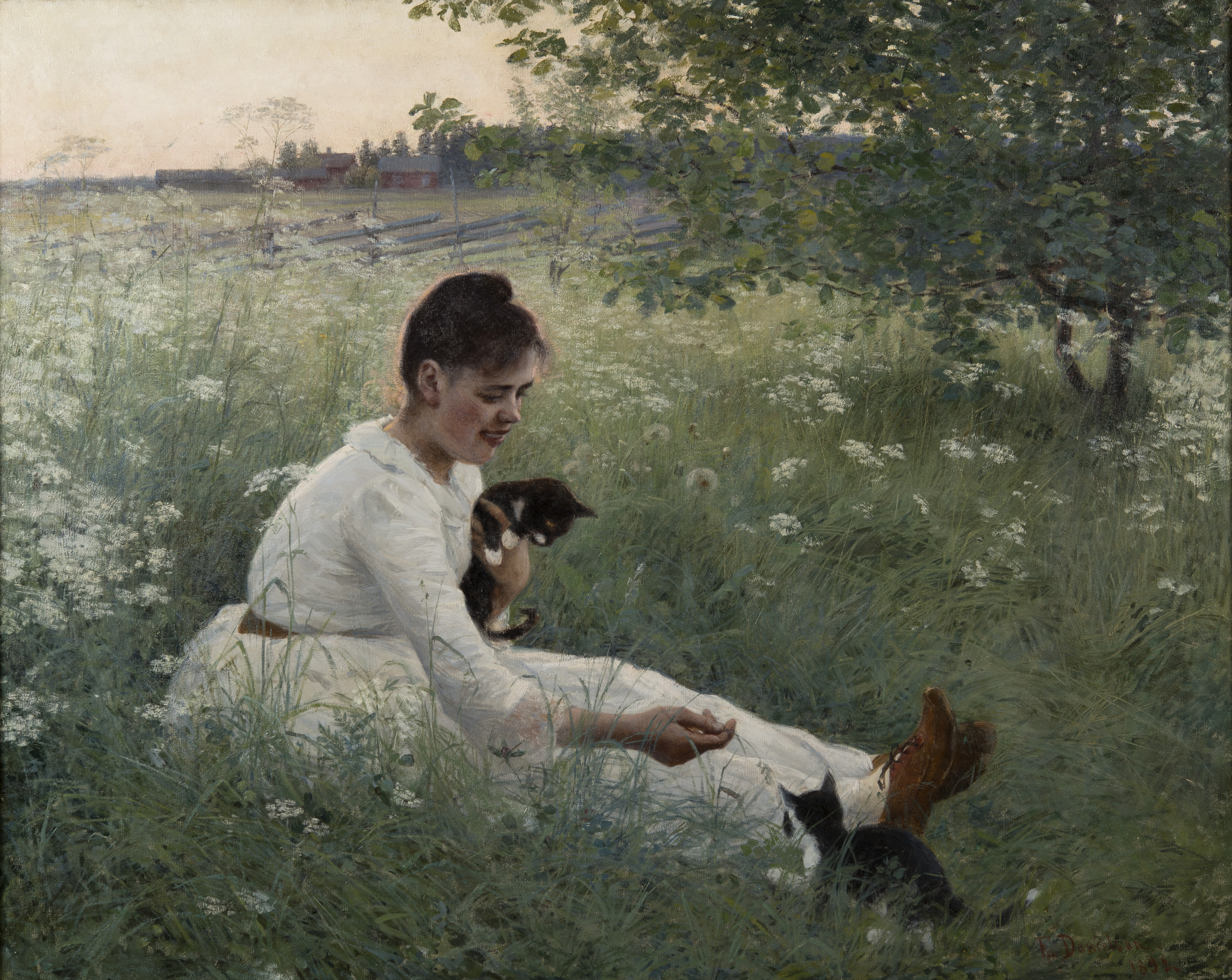
Girl with Cats in a Summer Landscape, 1892

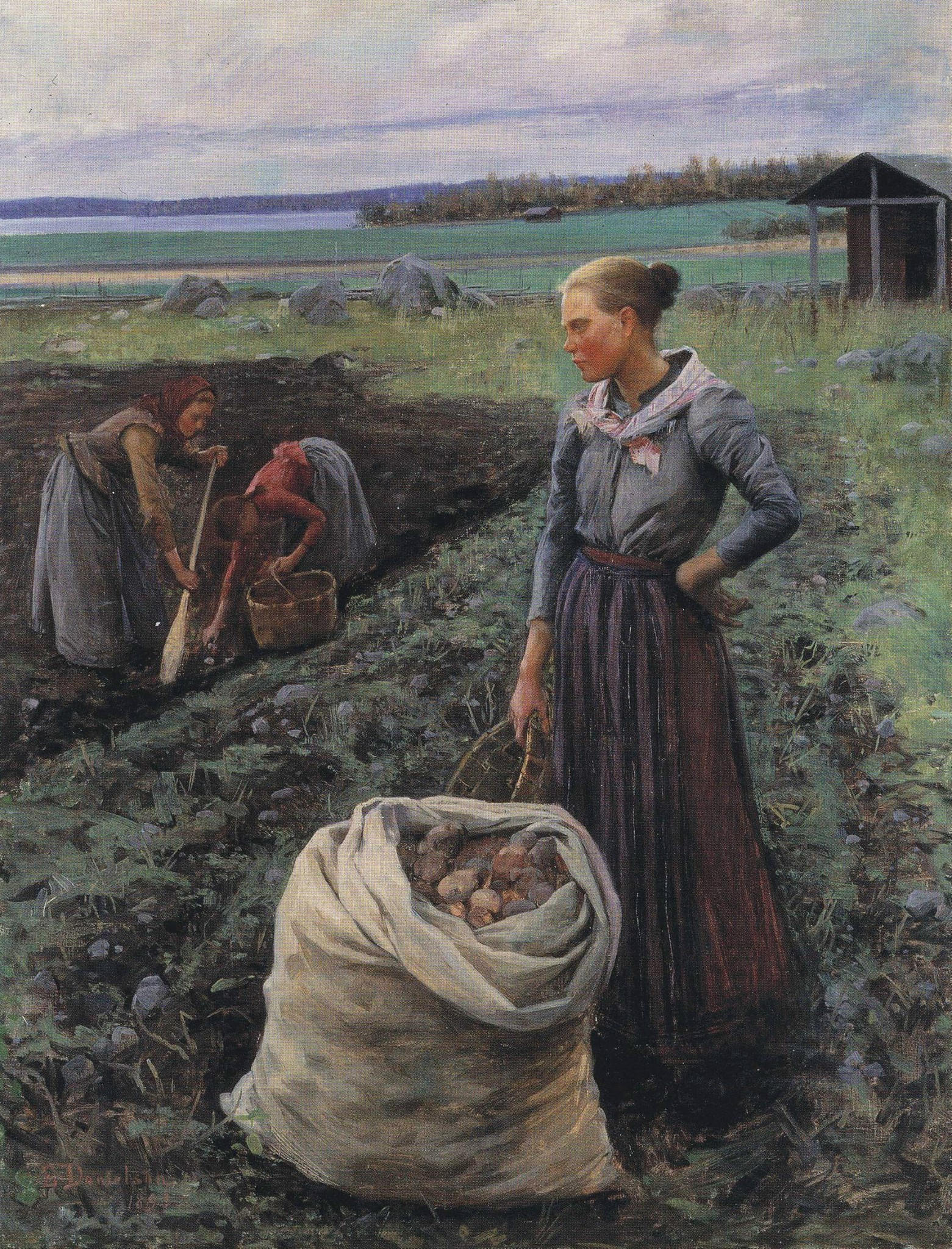
Potato Harvesters, 1893

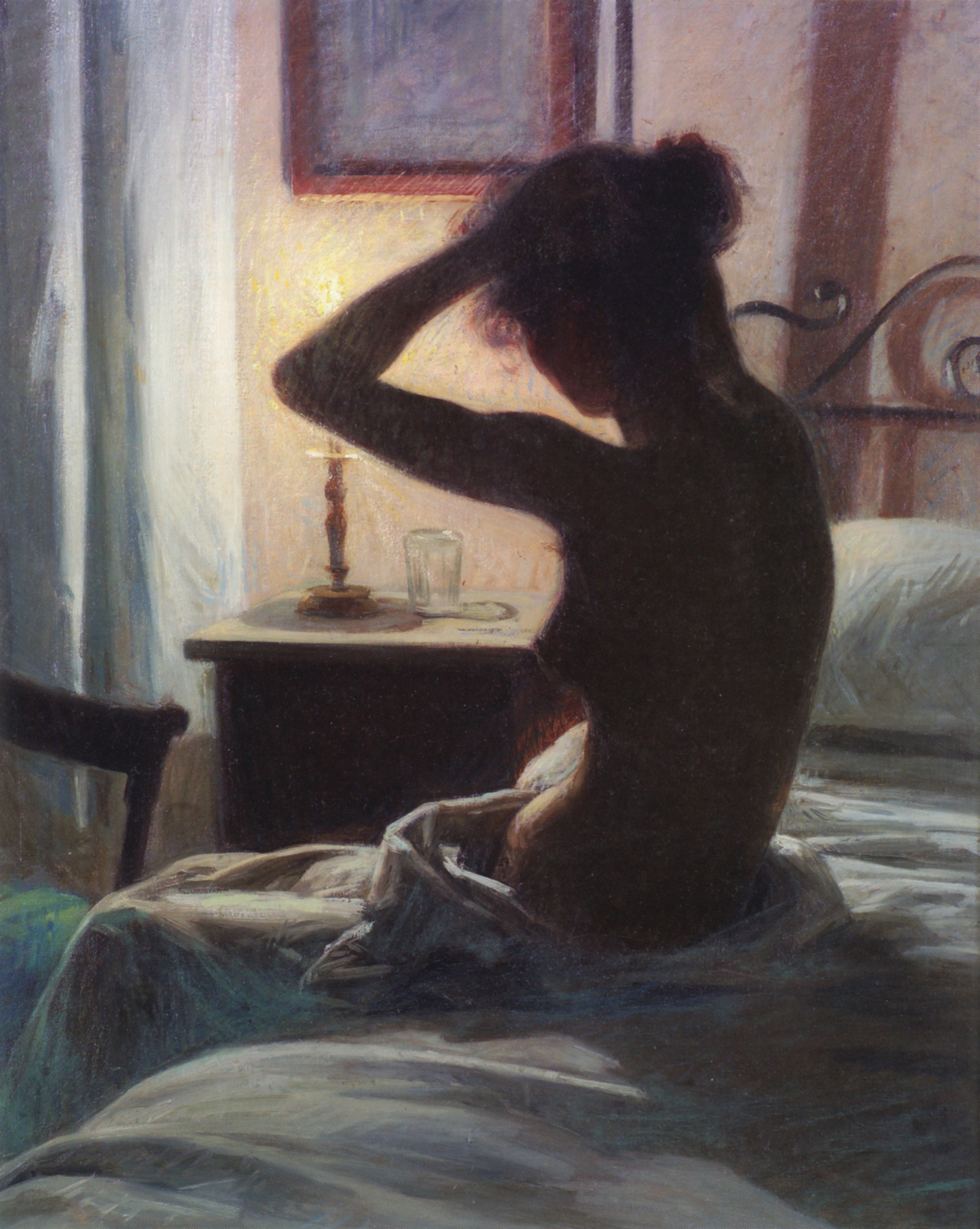
To Bed, 1897

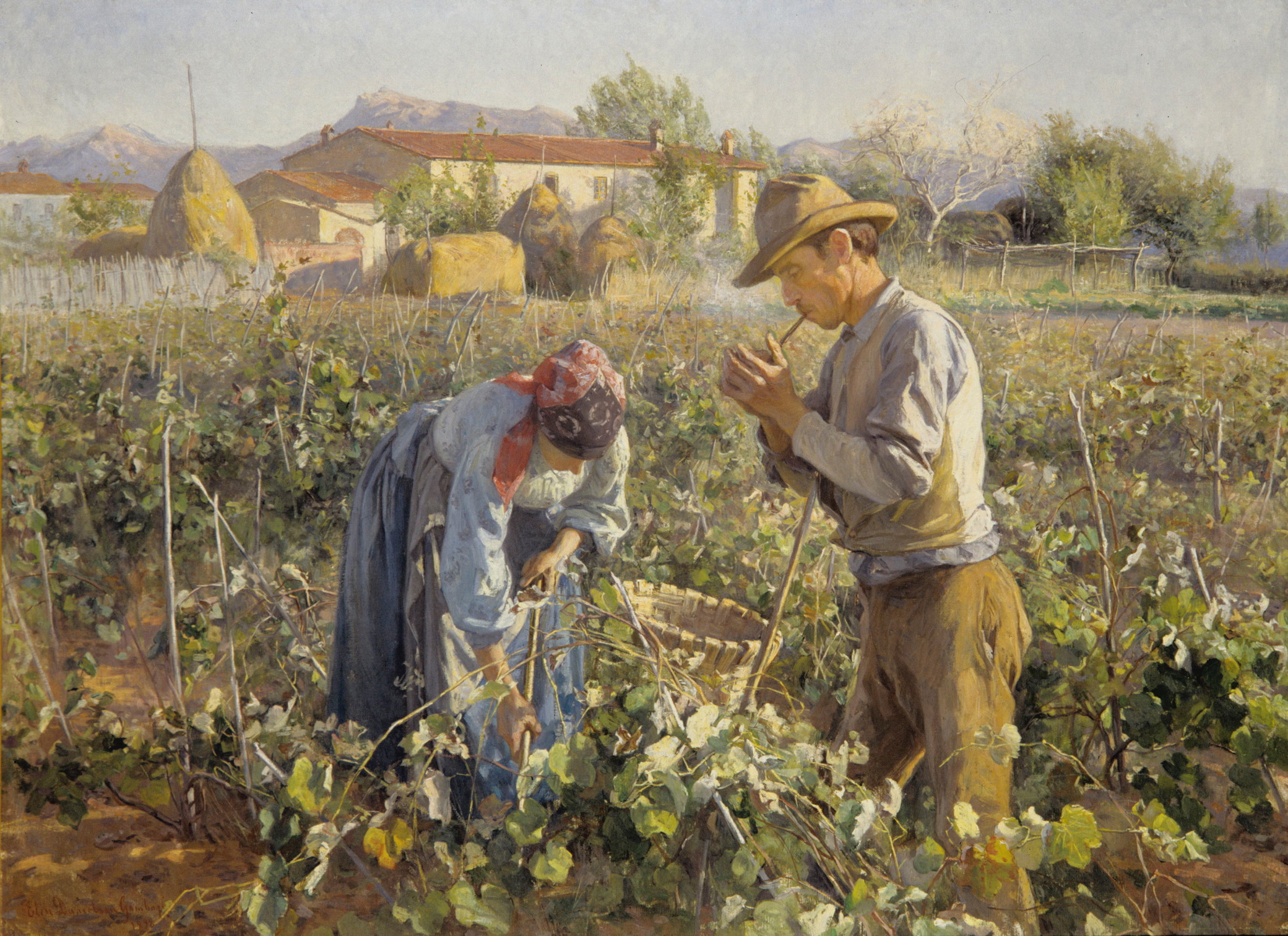
In the Vineyard, 1898

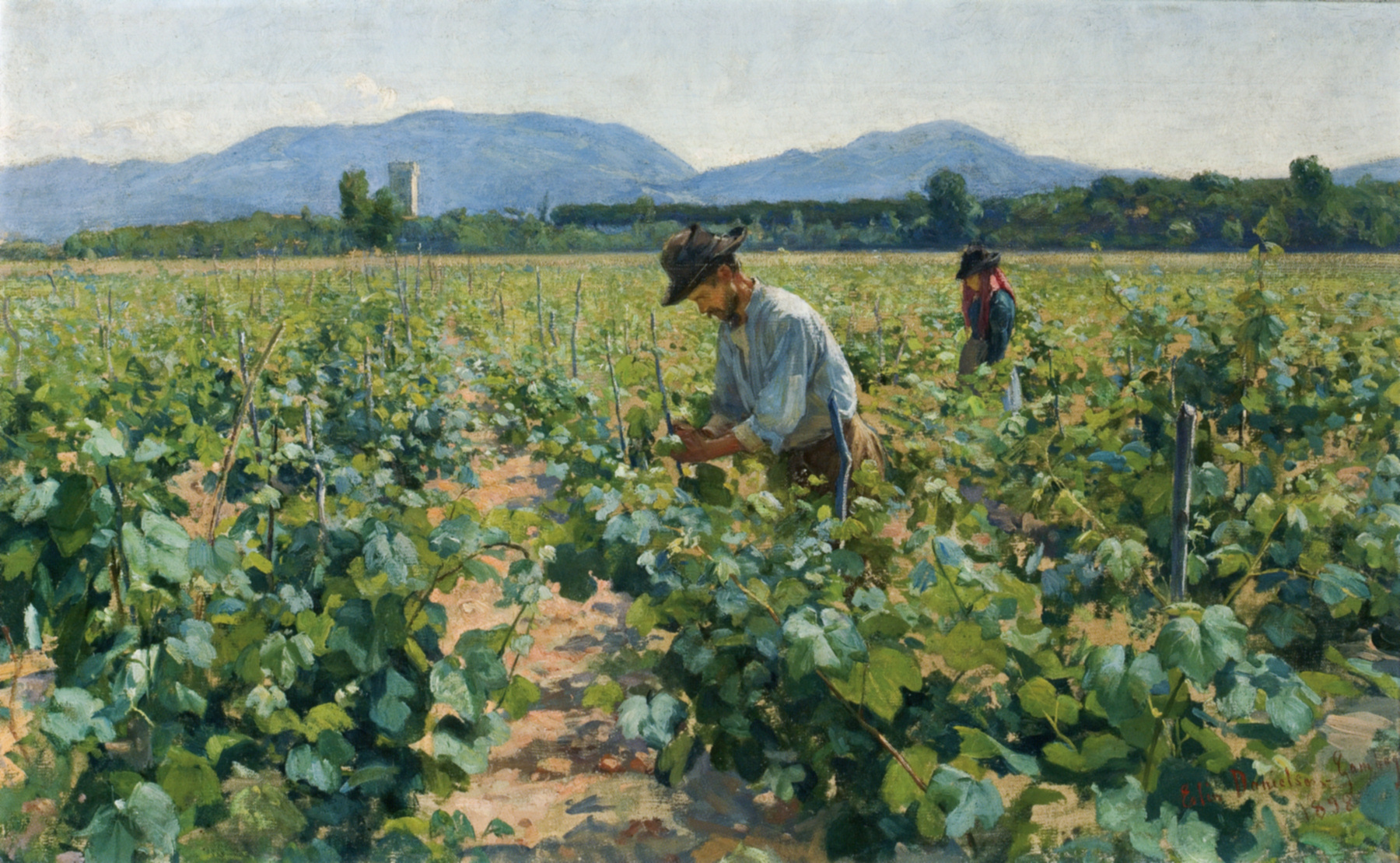
In the Vineyard II, 1898

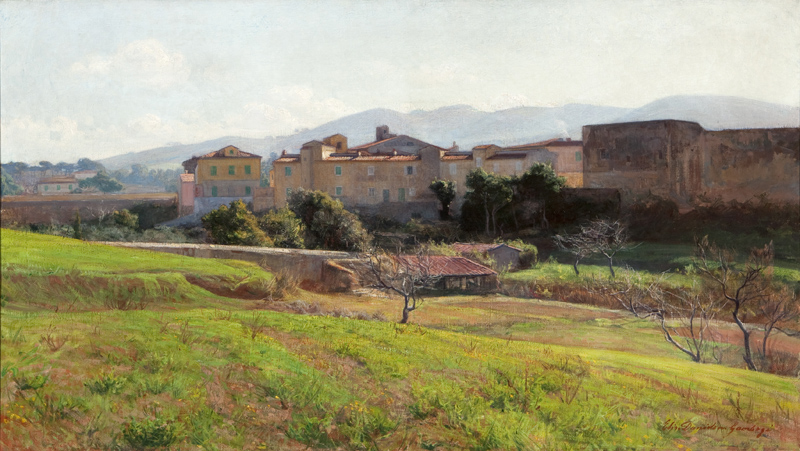
Antignano, 1900

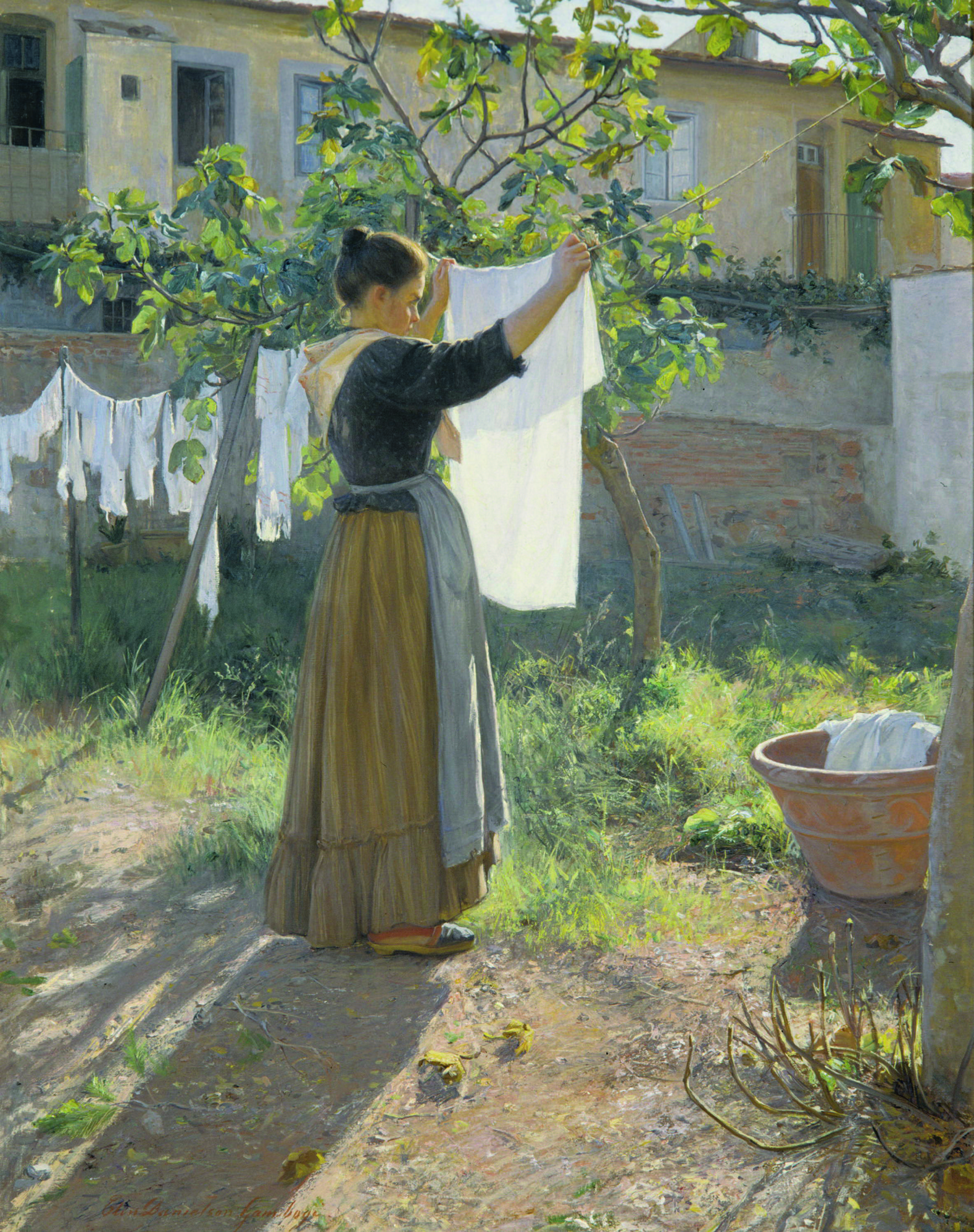
A Sunny Day, 1900

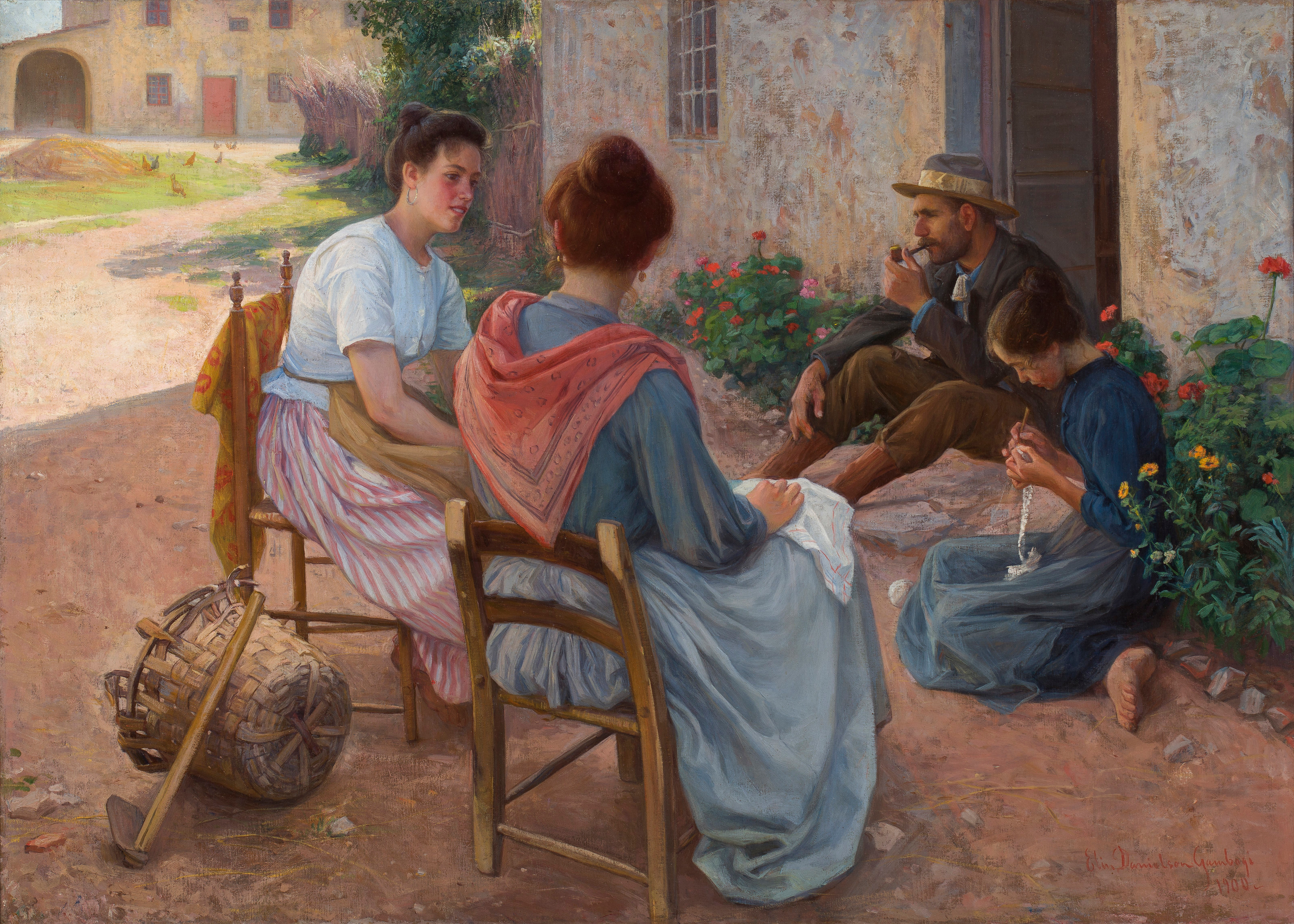
Italian Family, 1900

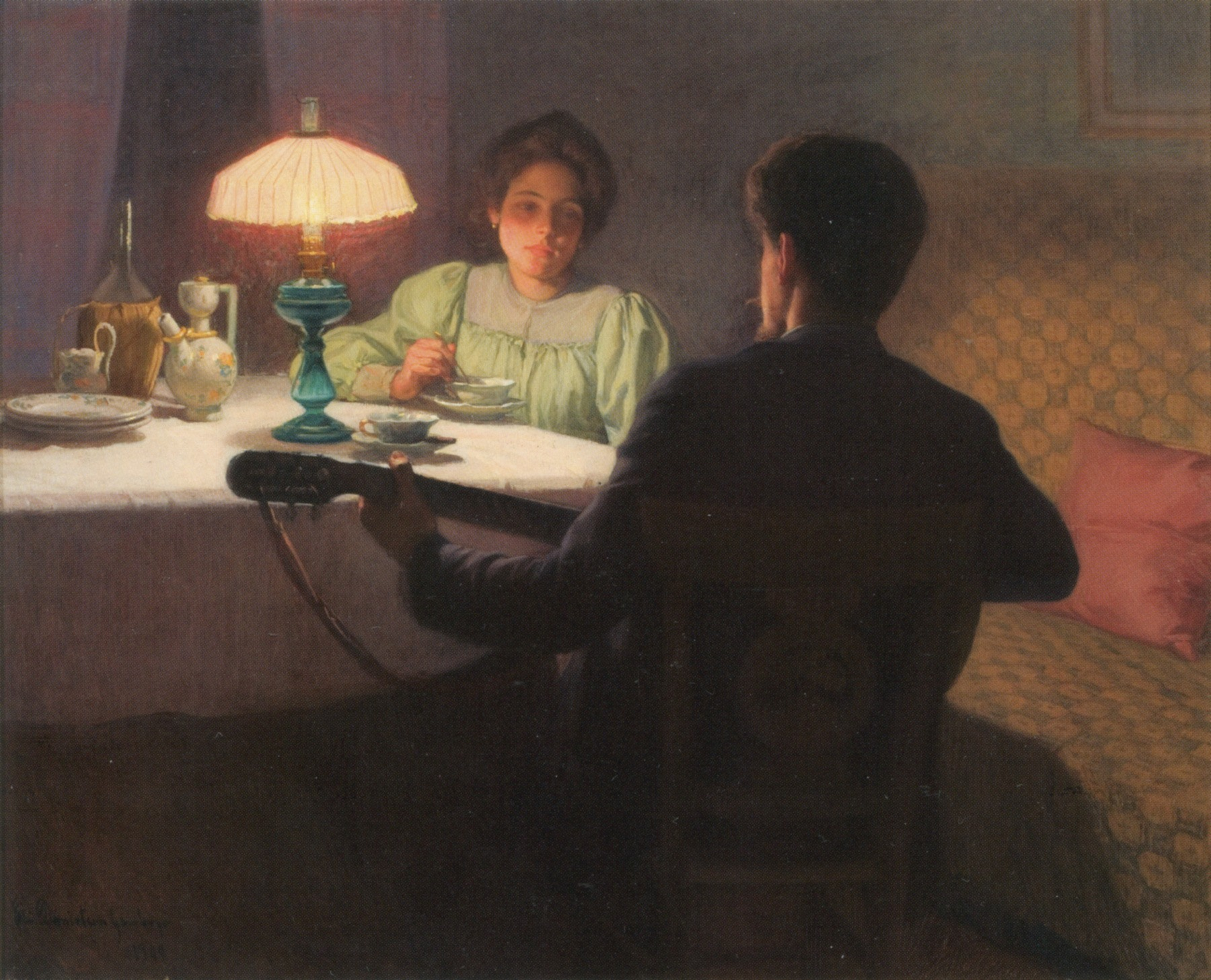
Evening Spell (After Dinner), 1900, with her husband Raffaello playing guitar to a guest

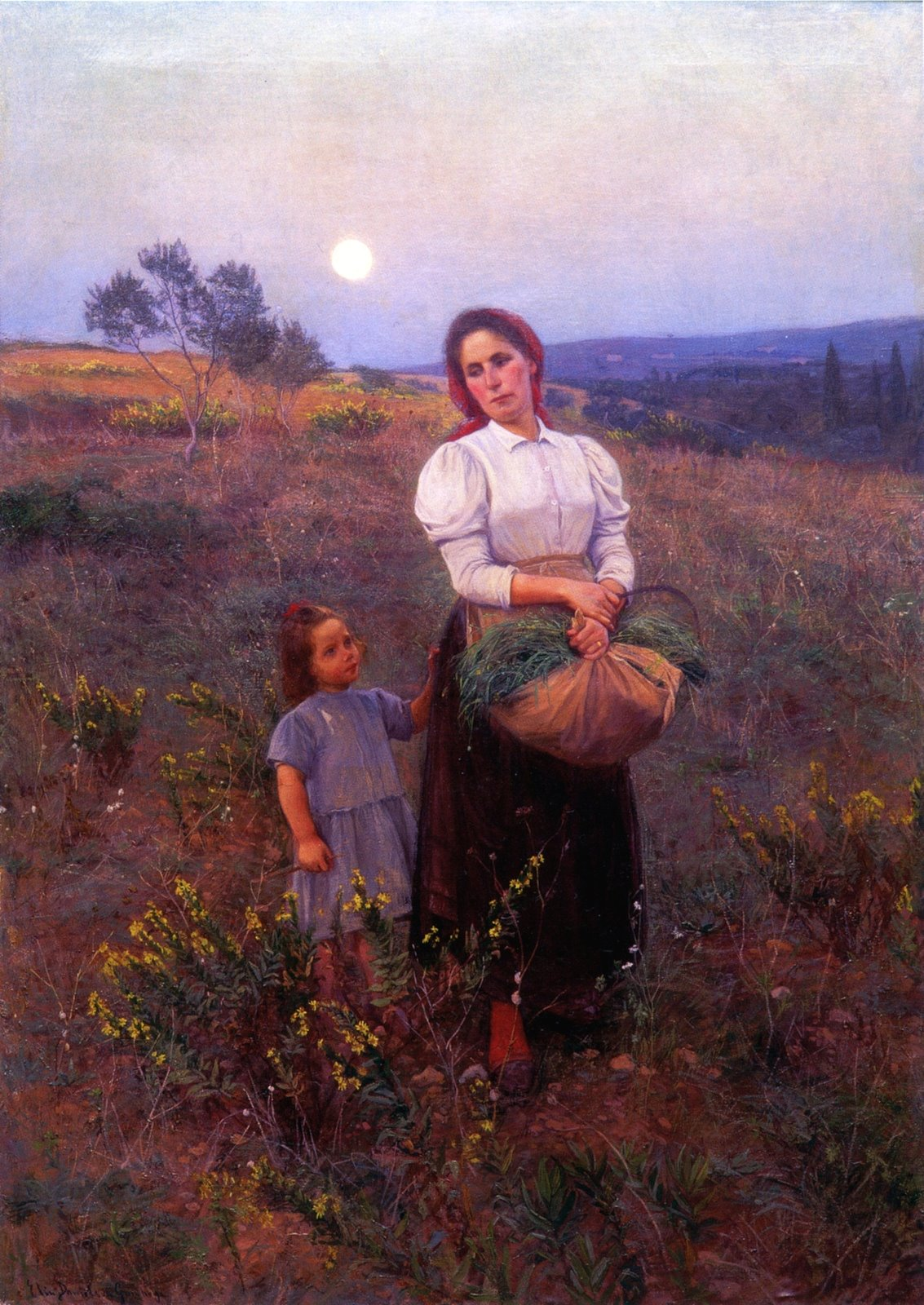
On the Way Home in the Evening Light, 1901

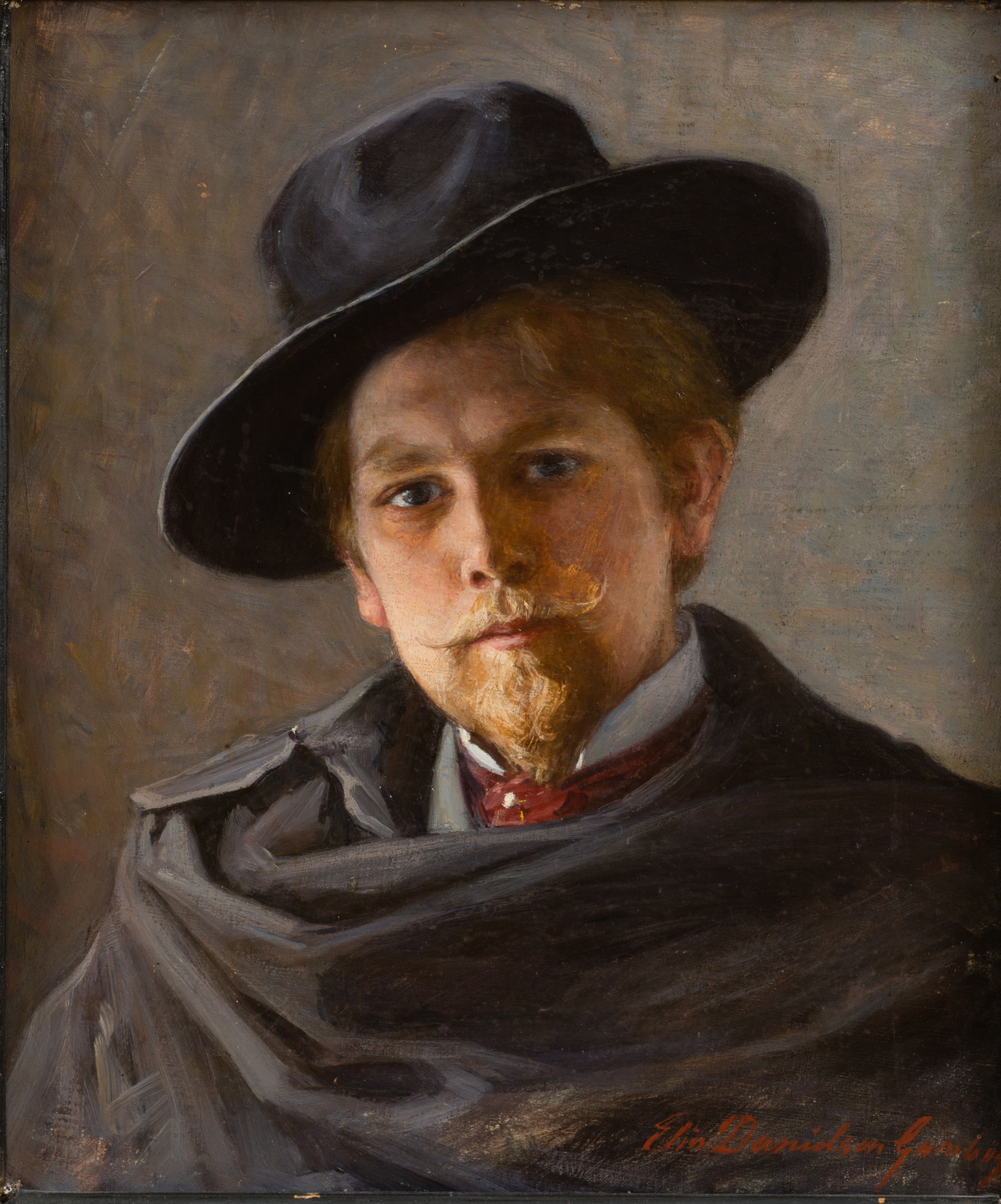
The Musician, unknown date

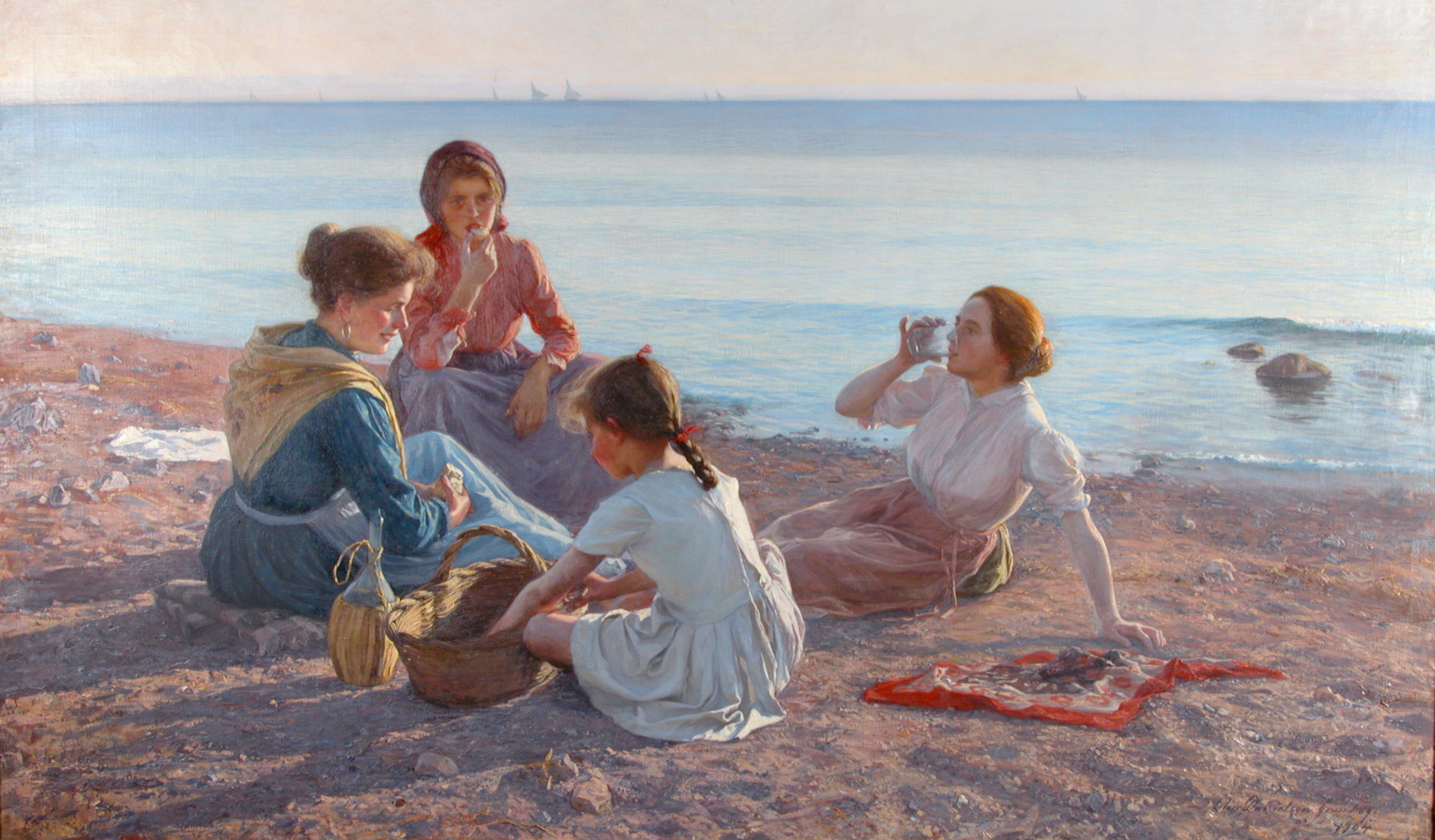
La Merenda, 1904, at the Antignano beach in Livorno

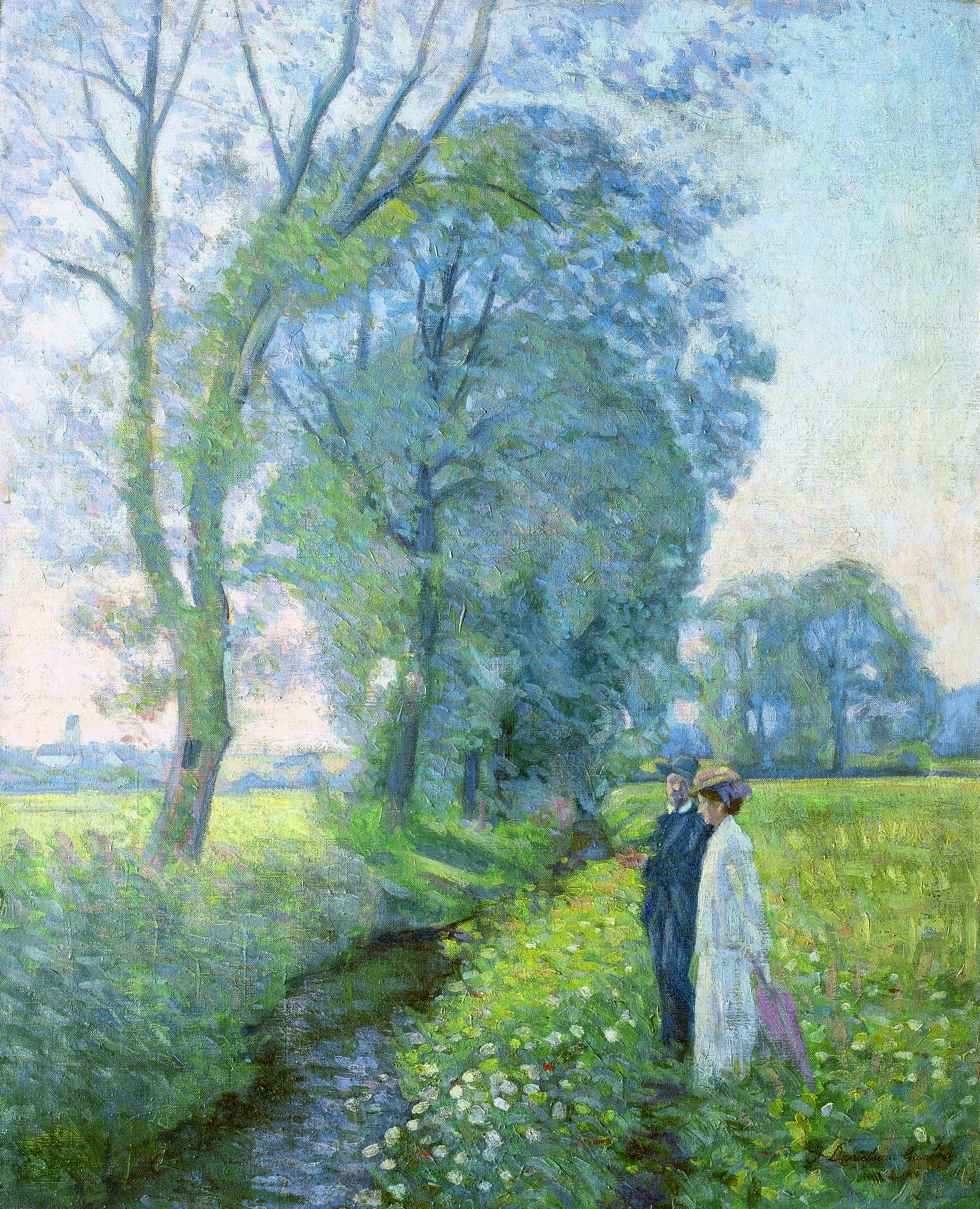
Engaged, 1906

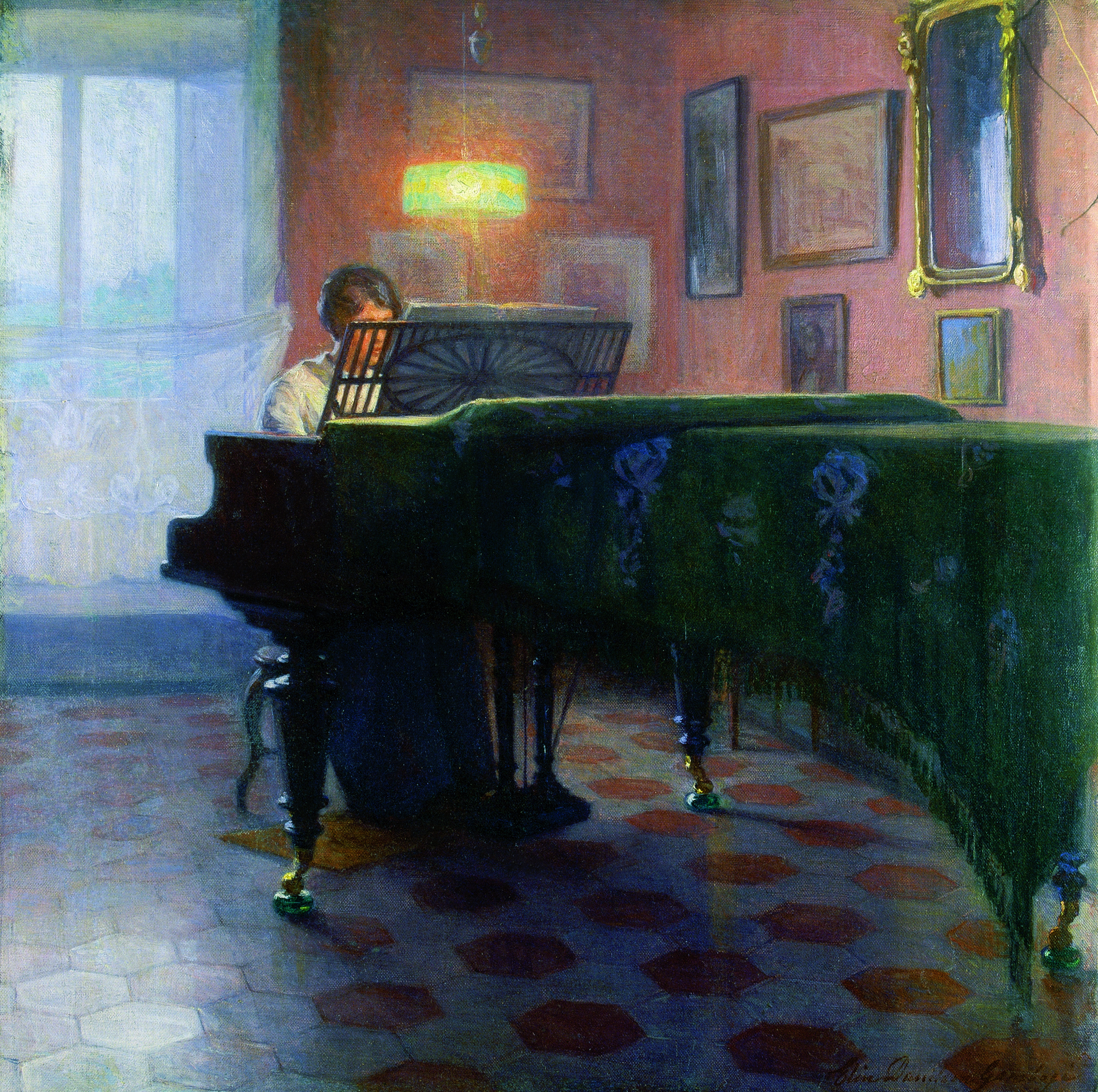
The Piano Player, 1907

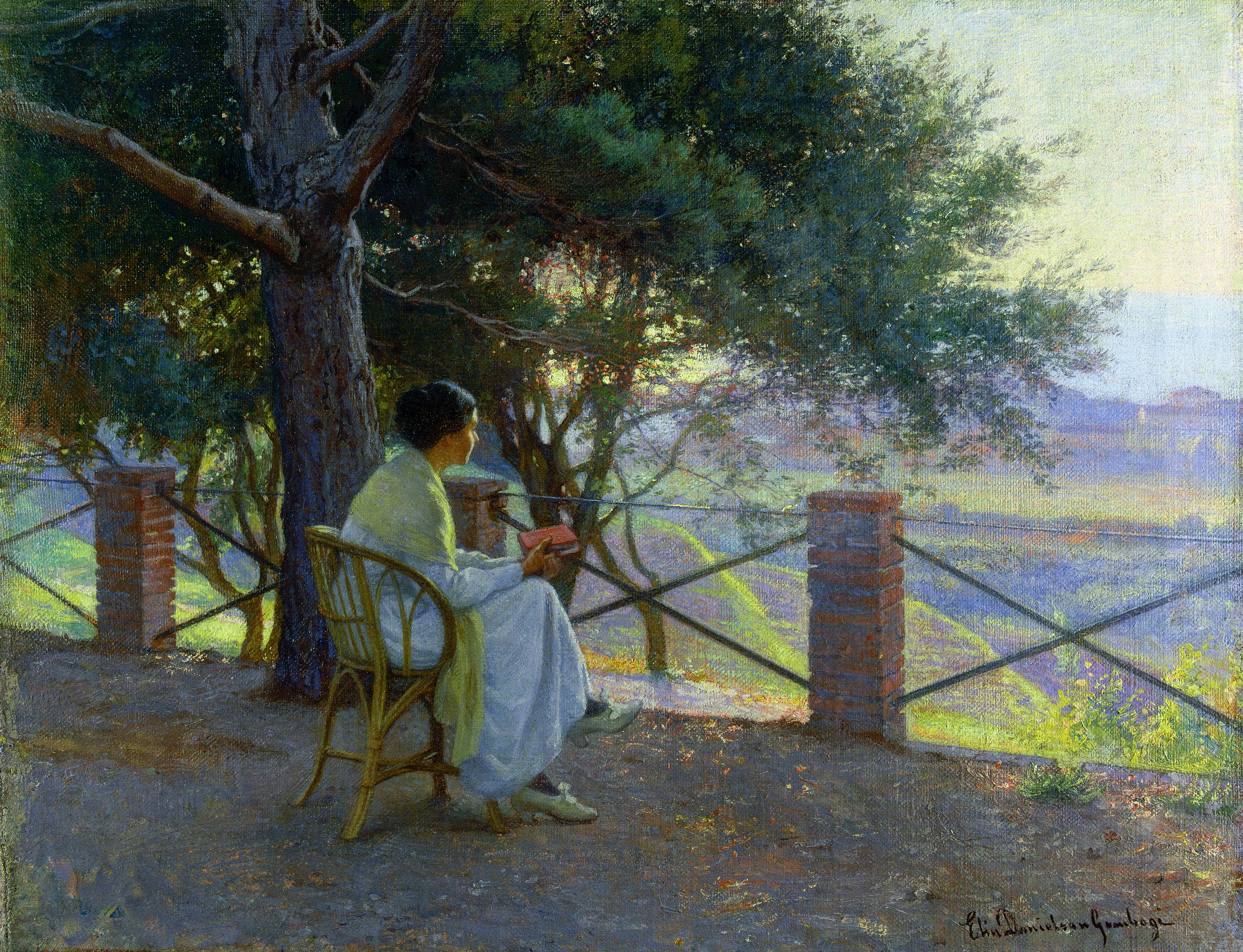
Sunset, 1915

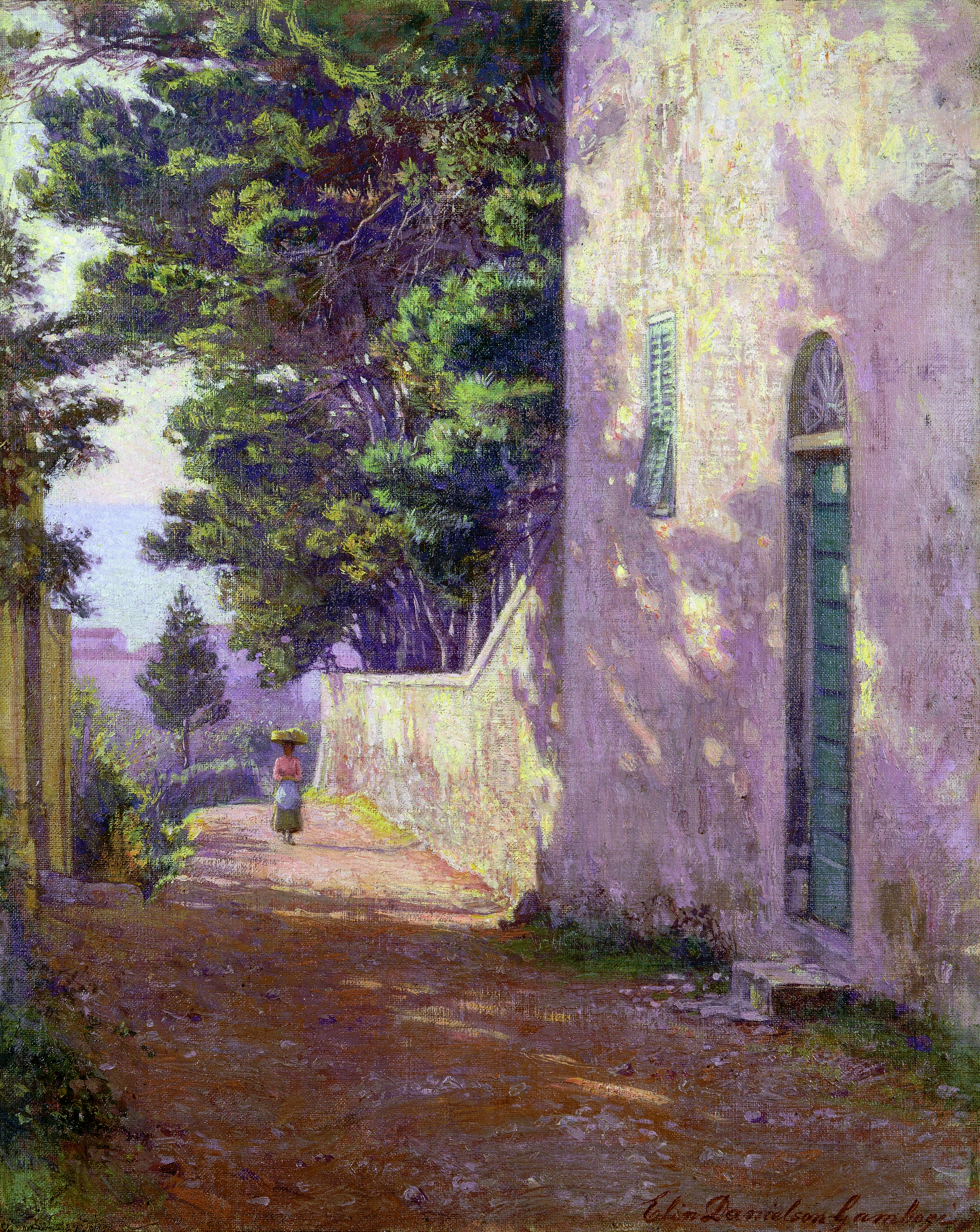
Antignano, 1917

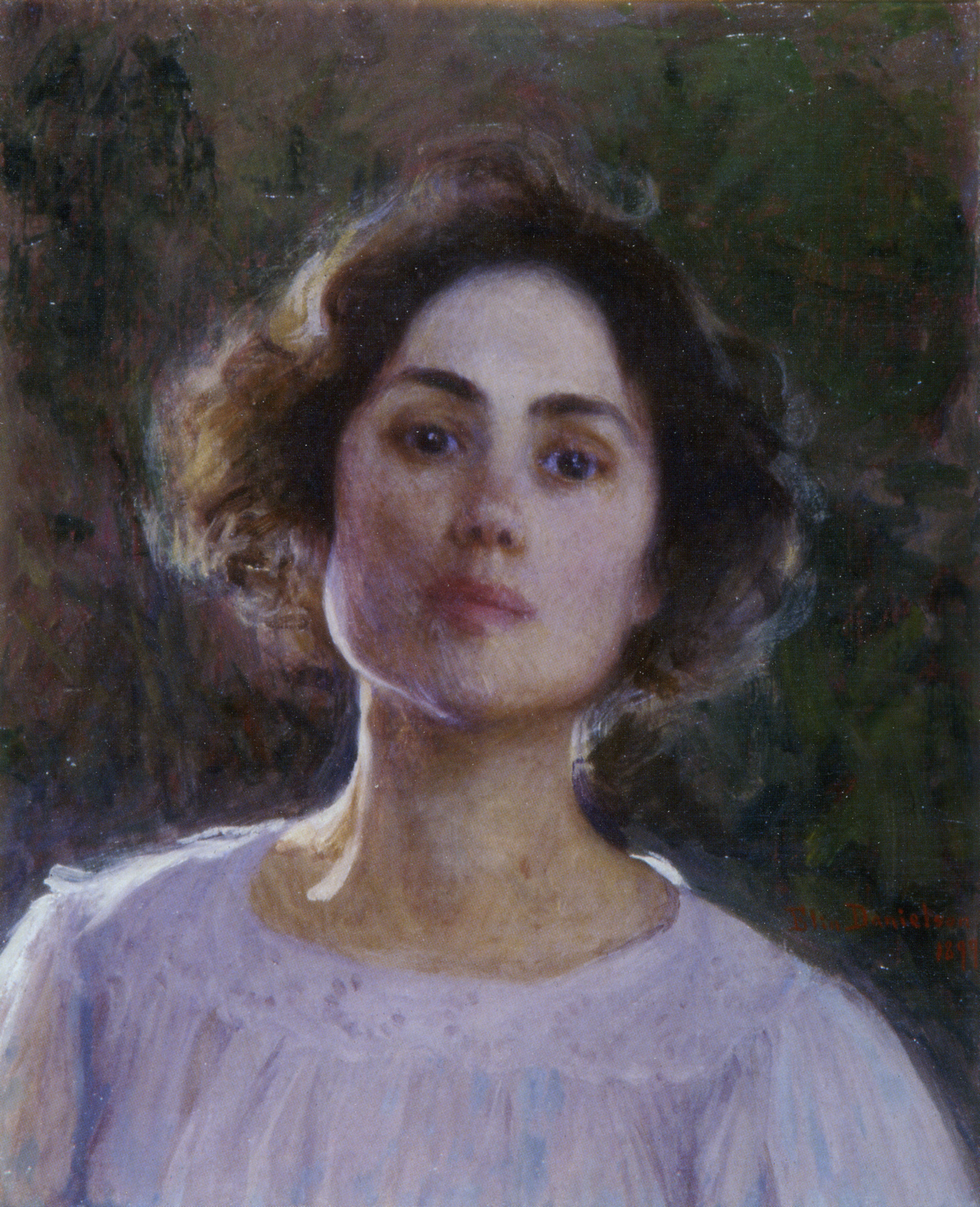
Self-Portrait, 1899

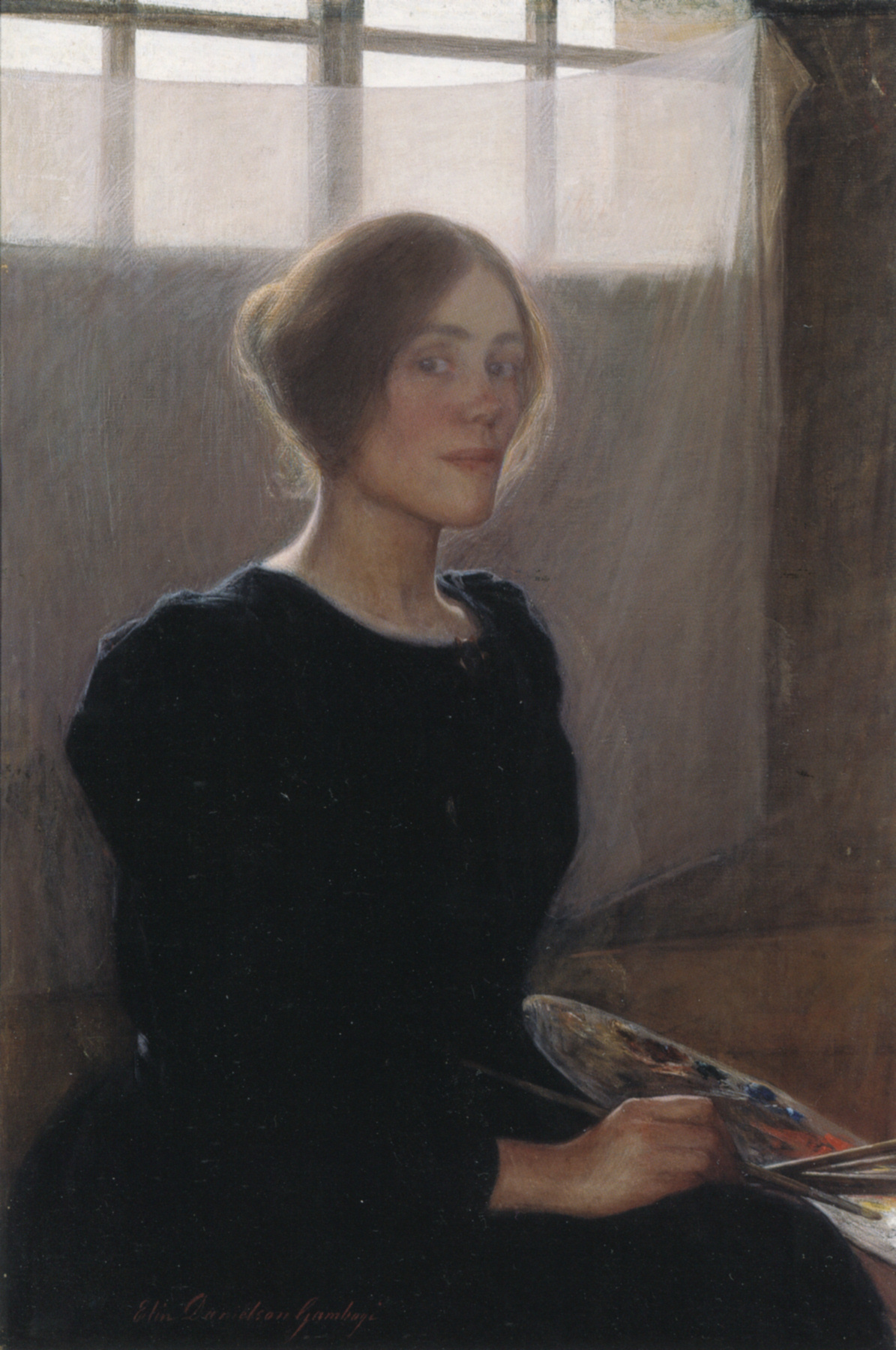
Self-Portrait, 1900

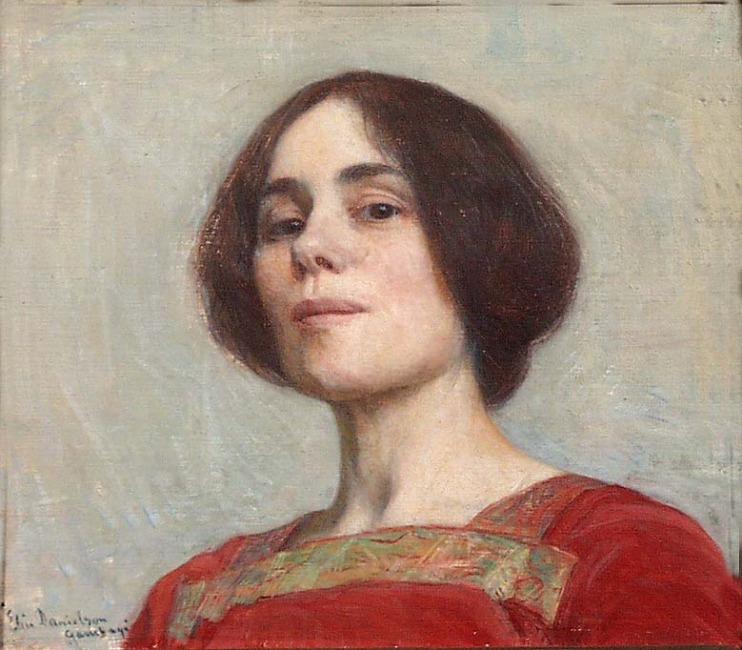
Self-Portrait, 1903

== See also ==
- Art in Finland
