= Raffaello Gambogi =

Italian painter (1874–1943)

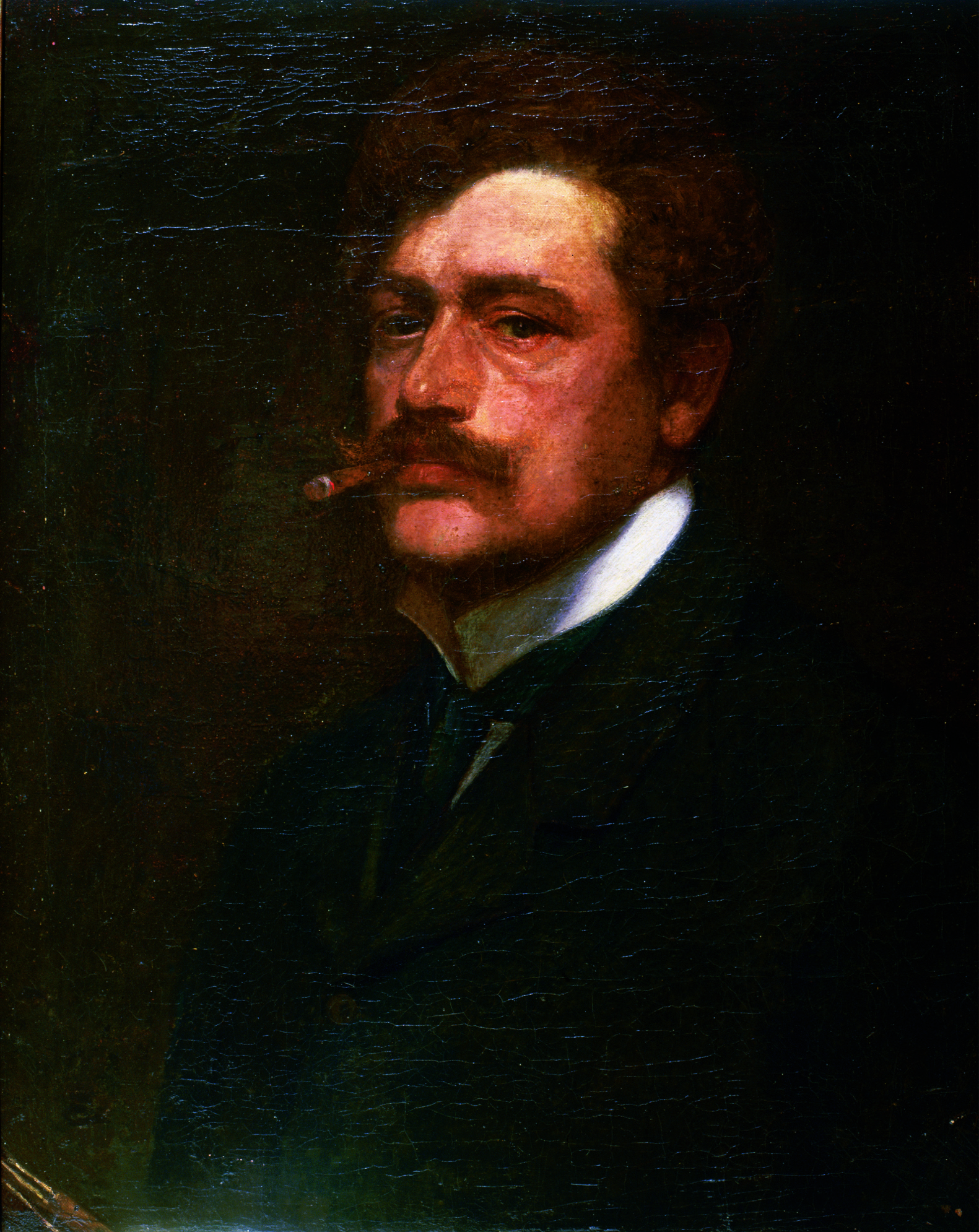
Self-Portrait, 1903

Raffaello Gambogi (1874 – 1943) was an Italian painter, mainly of urban landscapes and genre scenes.

== Biography ==
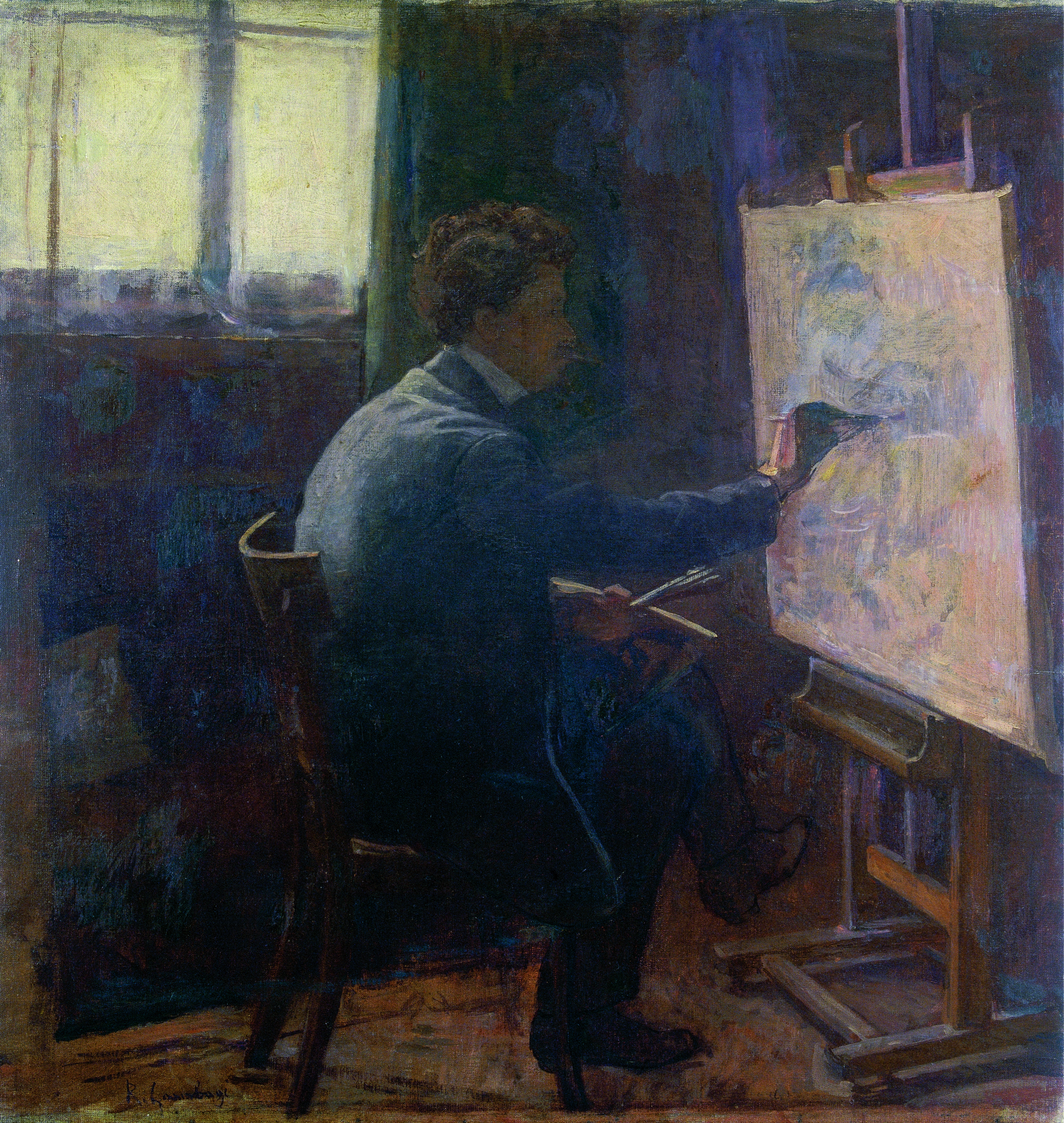
Self-Portrait with Easel, 1899

Gambogi was born in Livorno. In 1891 he obtained a scholarship to the Academy of Fine Arts of Florence, where he studied under Giovanni Fattori. Among his works, L’uscita della messa was awarded the Florence Prize in 1896, All’ombra displayed at the Fine Arts Exposition adjacent to the Festa dell’Arte e dei Fiori in Florence. In 1898 Gambogi sent Cantire to the National Exposition of Fine Arts at Turin. An example of his work, La veduta sul porto di Livorno, is not a classically beautified vedute, but reminds the viewer that Livorno was a modern port city bustling with stevedores. Similarly, the painting The emigrants depicts a family at a bustling dockside (Museo Giovanni Fattori, Livorno).

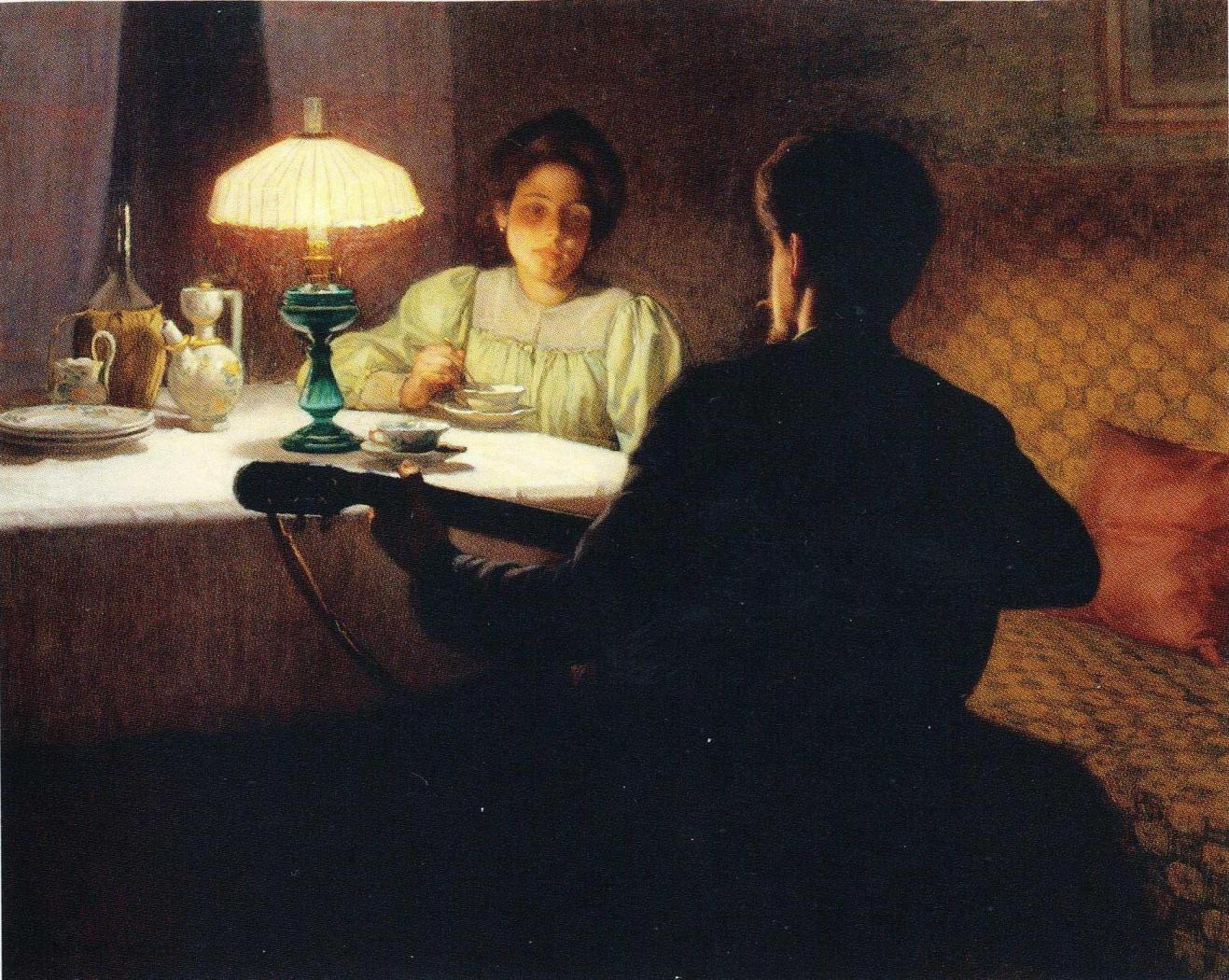
Evening Spell, where he plays the guitar to a guest, painted by Elin Danielson-Gambogi in 1900

His wife, Elin Danielson-Gambogi (3 September 1861 – 31 December 1919), was a prominent Finnish painter. Their marriage became strained when Raffaello had an affair with Danielson's friend, Finnish painter Dora Wahlroos. Although the affair ended quickly, it left a lasting mark on the Gambogis' relationship.

== Works ==
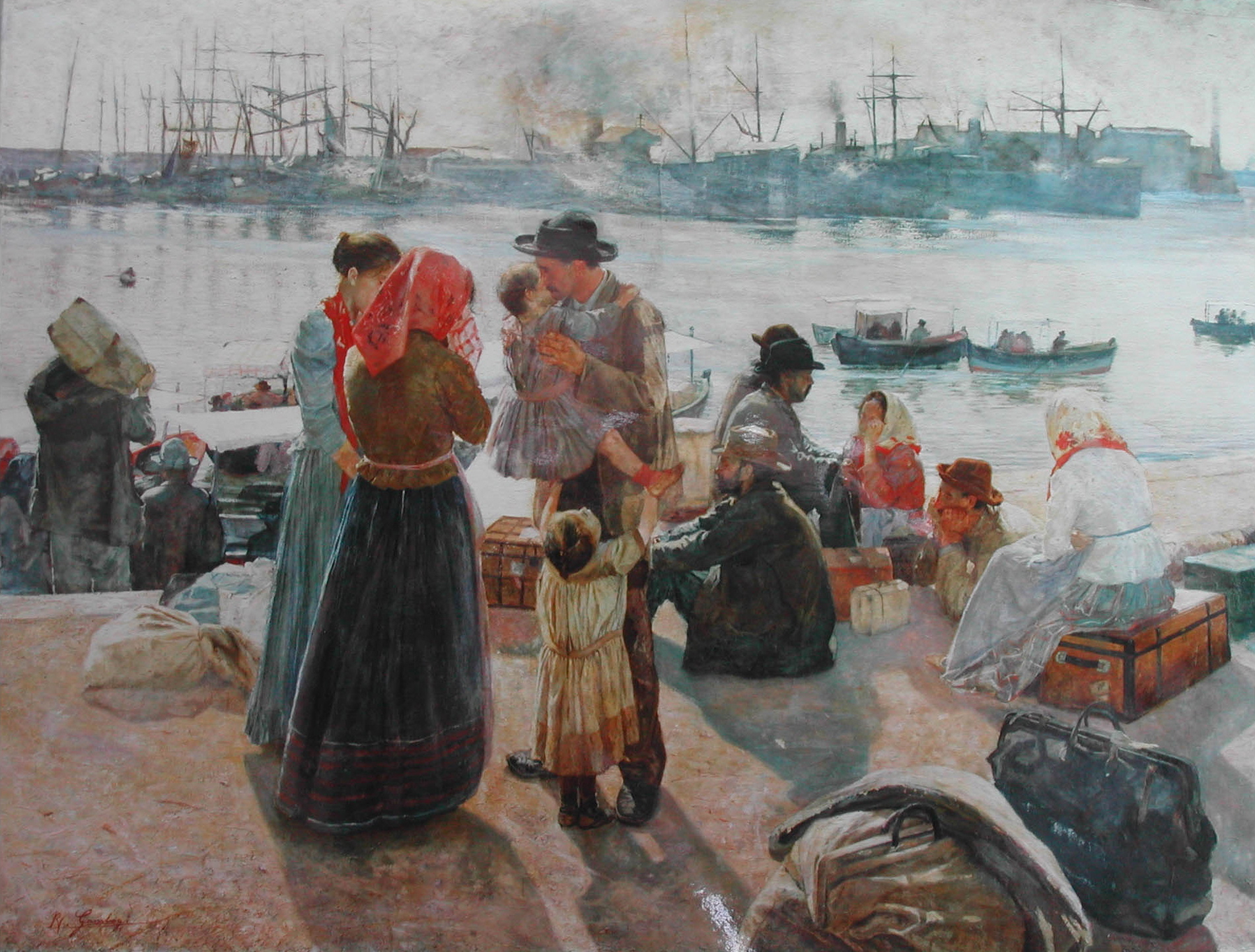
The Immigrants, 1894

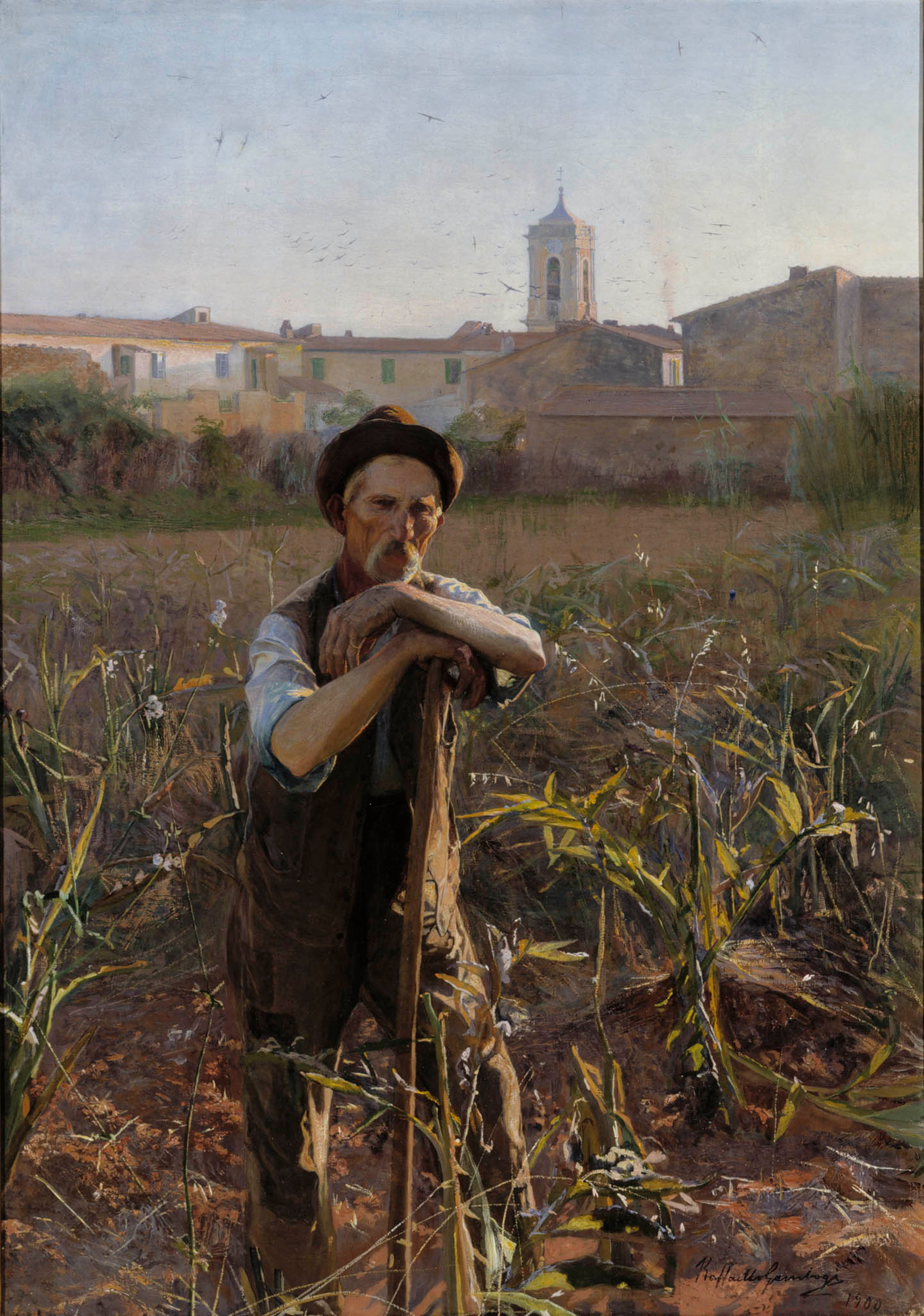
Rest, 1900

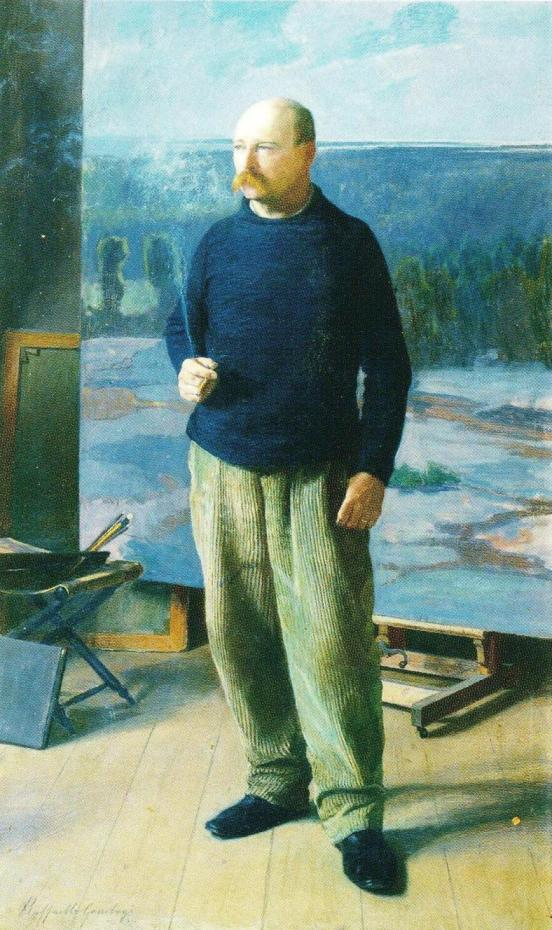
Portrait of Victor Westerholm, 1901

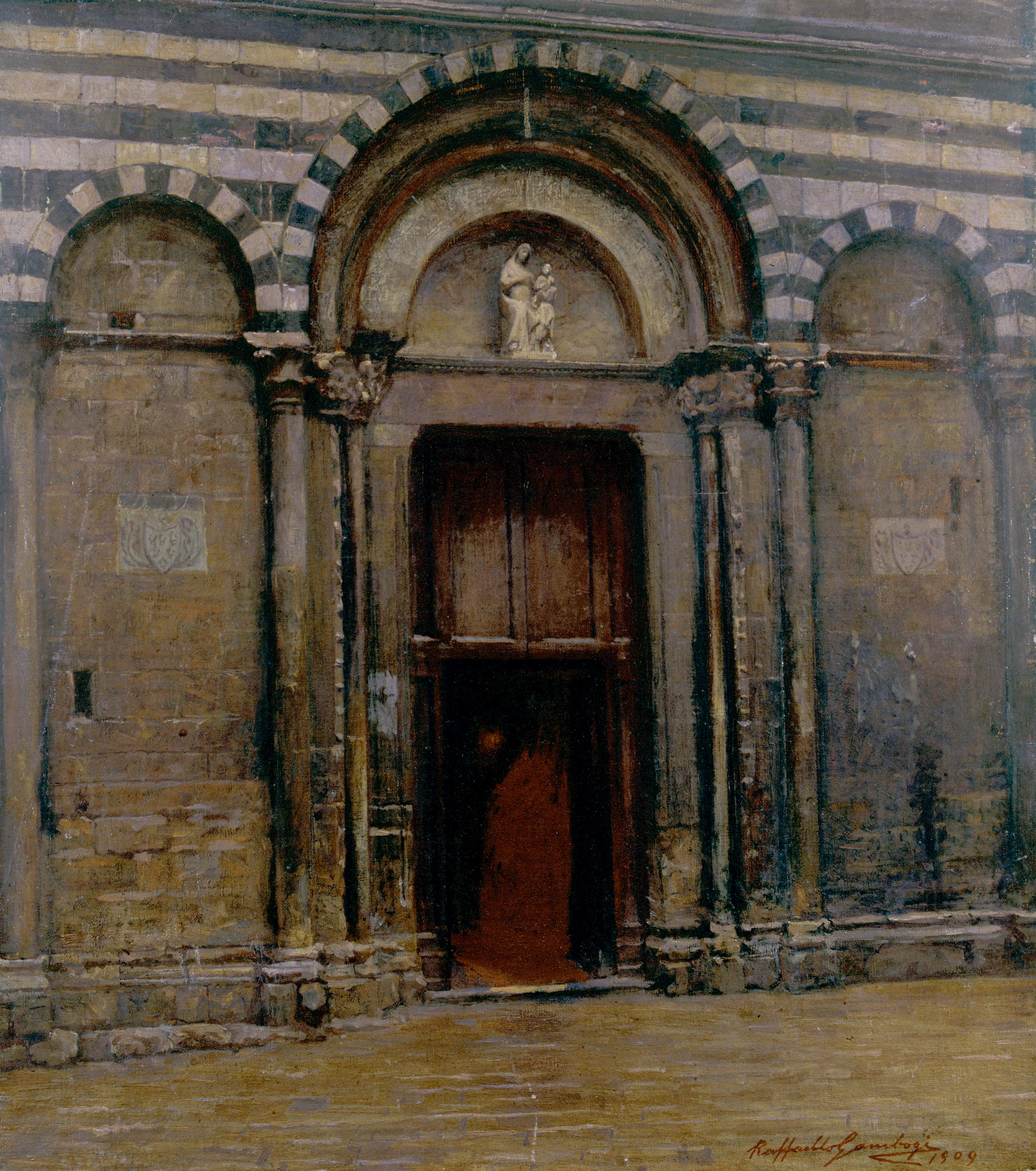
St. Michele Church, 1905-09

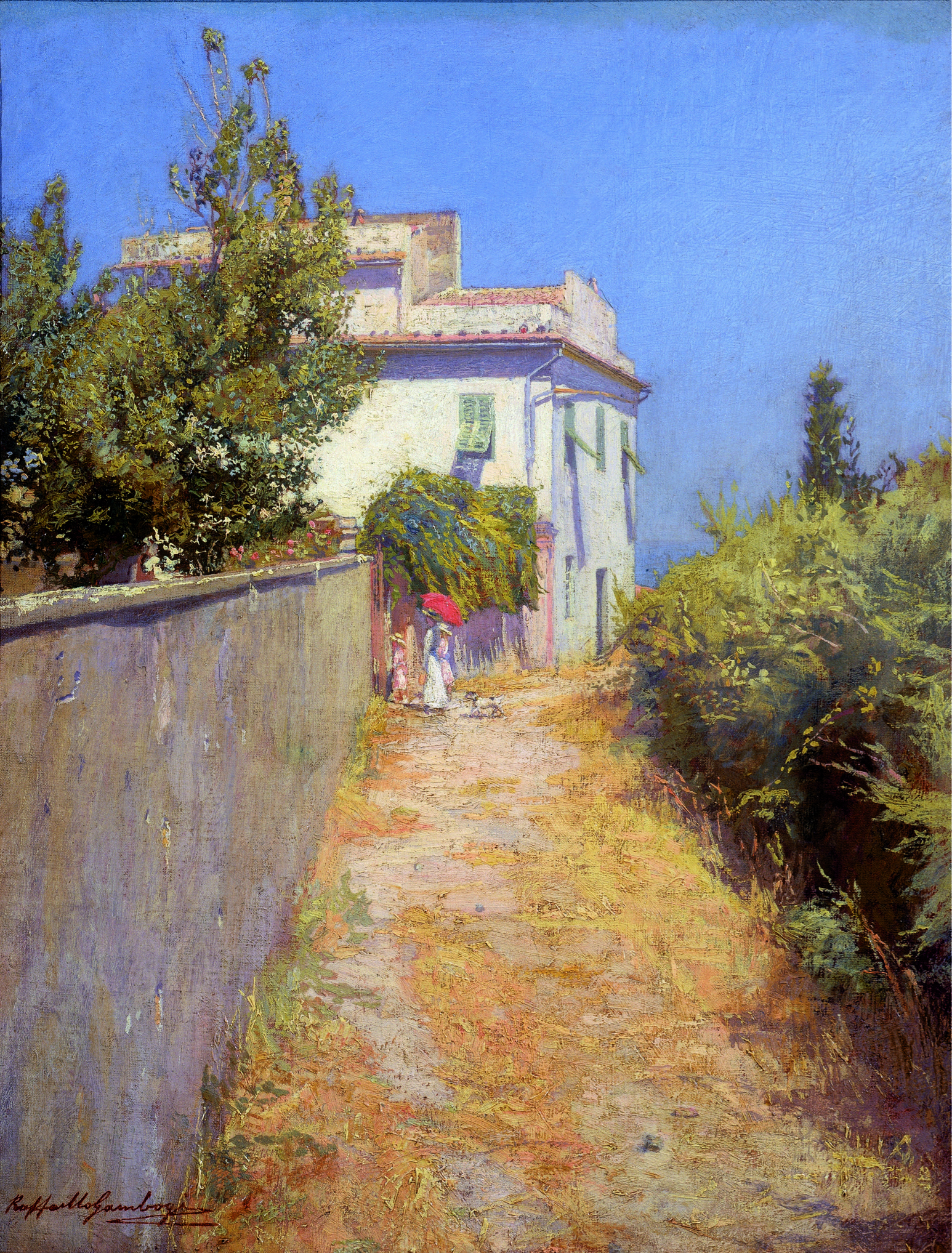
The Benvenuti House, 1915
