= Elias Muukka =

Finnish painter

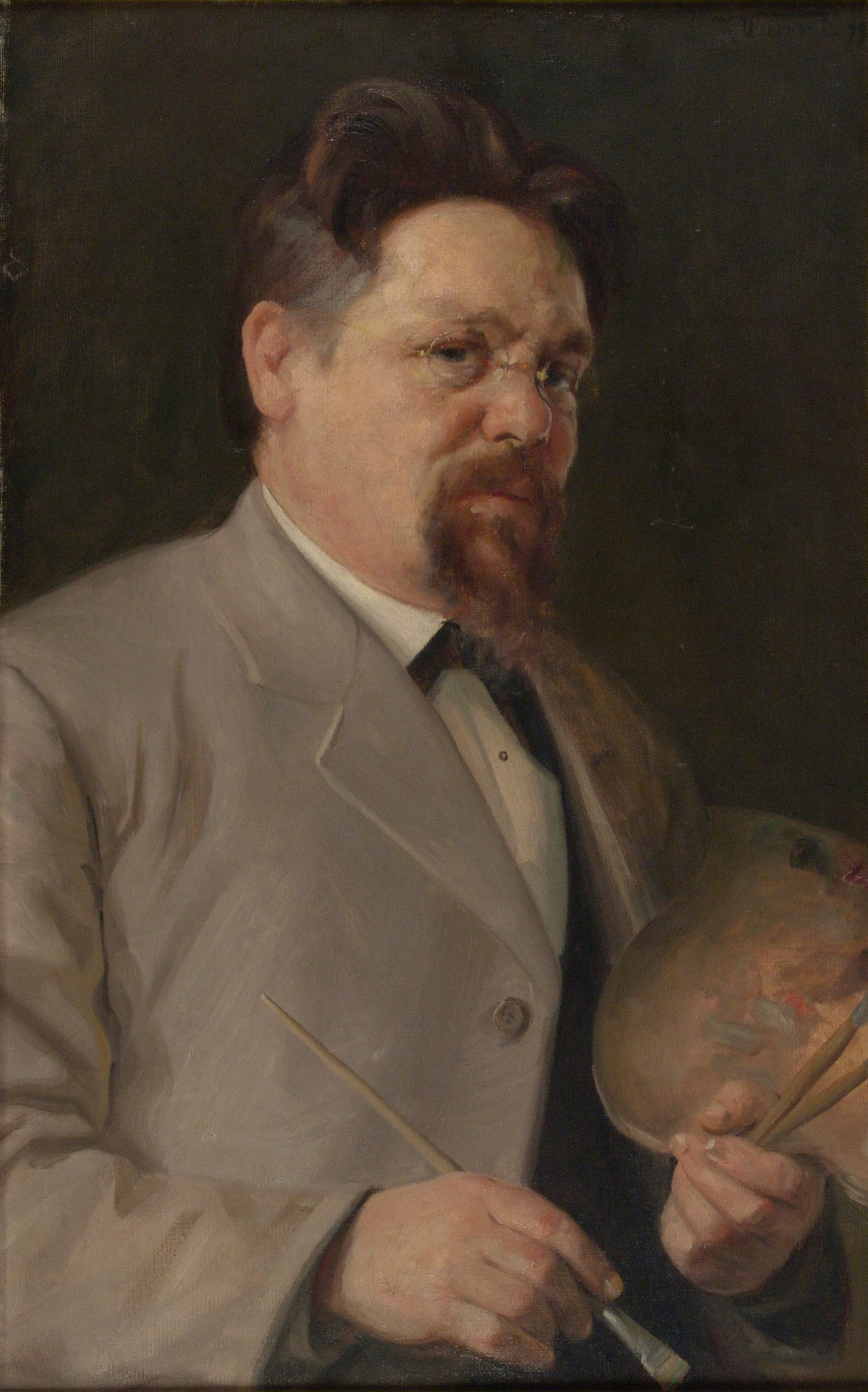
- Portrait of Muukka by Kaarlo Vuori, 1899
- Born: 10 June 1853; Lemi, Grand Duchy of Finland
- Died: 2 October 1938 (aged 85); Helsinki, Finland
- Known for: Painting

Elias Muukka (10 June 1853 – 2 October 1938) was a Finnish painter. He mainly painted landscapes, usually from the rural areas of Karelia and from Turku.

== Biography ==
He was born at the village of Suontakainen in Lemi, Finland. He attended school at Vyborg. He studied at the Academy of Fine Arts, Helsinki in 1874–1877, at the Düsseldorf Art Academy in 1877–1879 and at the Académie Colarossi in Paris 1880–1881.

Following his début in 1876, he exhibited regularly at the Finnish Artists Exhibitions from 1892 to 1938. His works were also presented in Paris (1889) and Stockholm (1929). Muukka adopted the style of the Düsseldorf School. Typical of the Düsseldorf School, his work often includes landscapes of water scenes featuring figures.

He worked as a drawing instructor at the seminar in Sordavala in Karelia in 1883-1885 and founded a private school for drawing and painting in Vaasa in 1886. He worked as an instructor at Turku between 1891 and 1918. Later he was a teacher at the upper secondary schools in Savonlinna and Mikkeli until 1927.

Muukka was one of the artists who joined Victor Westerholm (1860–1919) in the artists colony at Önningeby on the island of Åland in the late 1880s. He lived from 1933 until his death during 1938 at Helsinki.

== Gallery ==
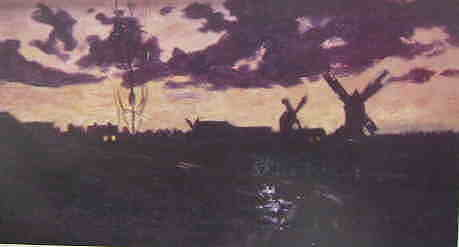
Night in Önningeby, 1888

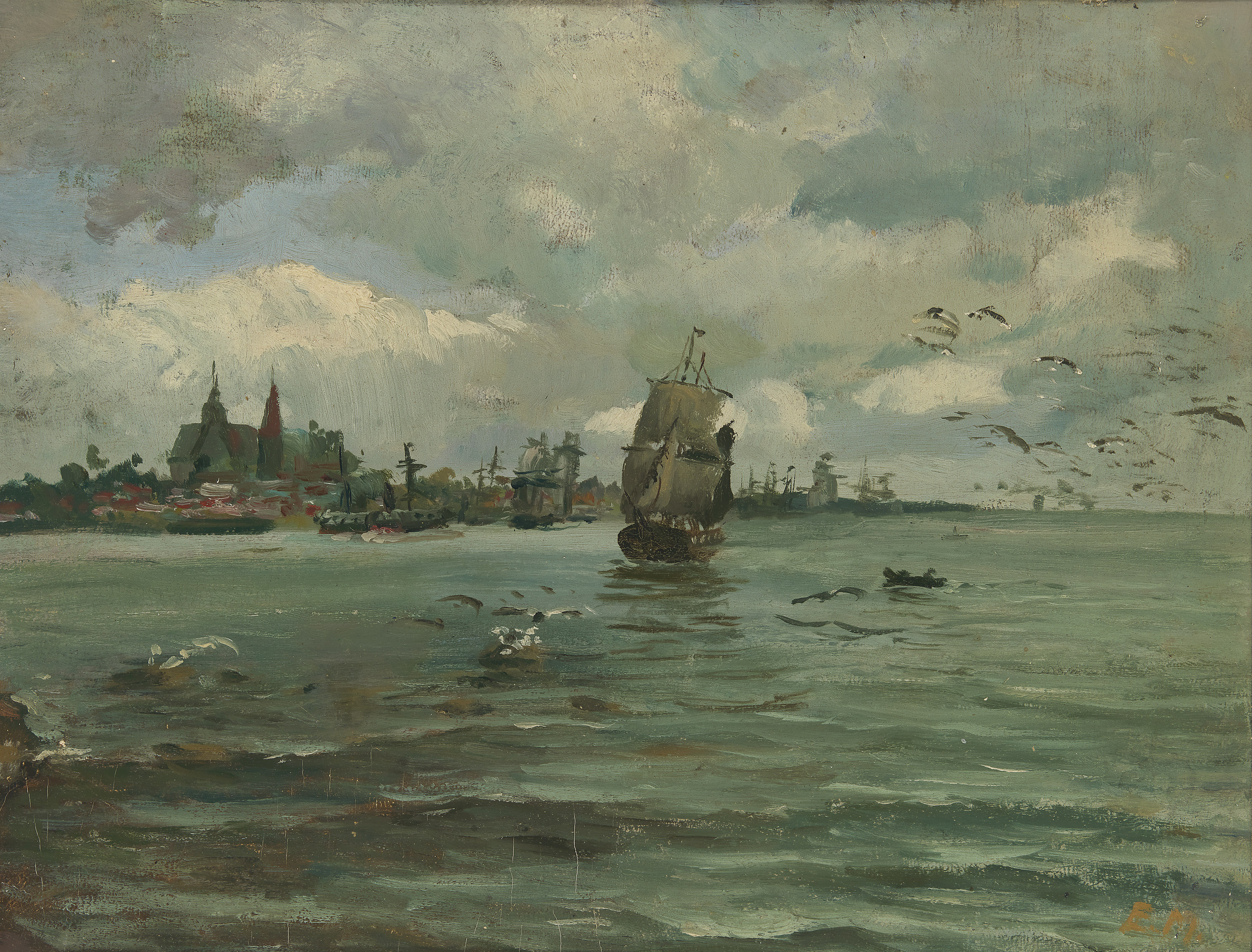
Seascape, 1890

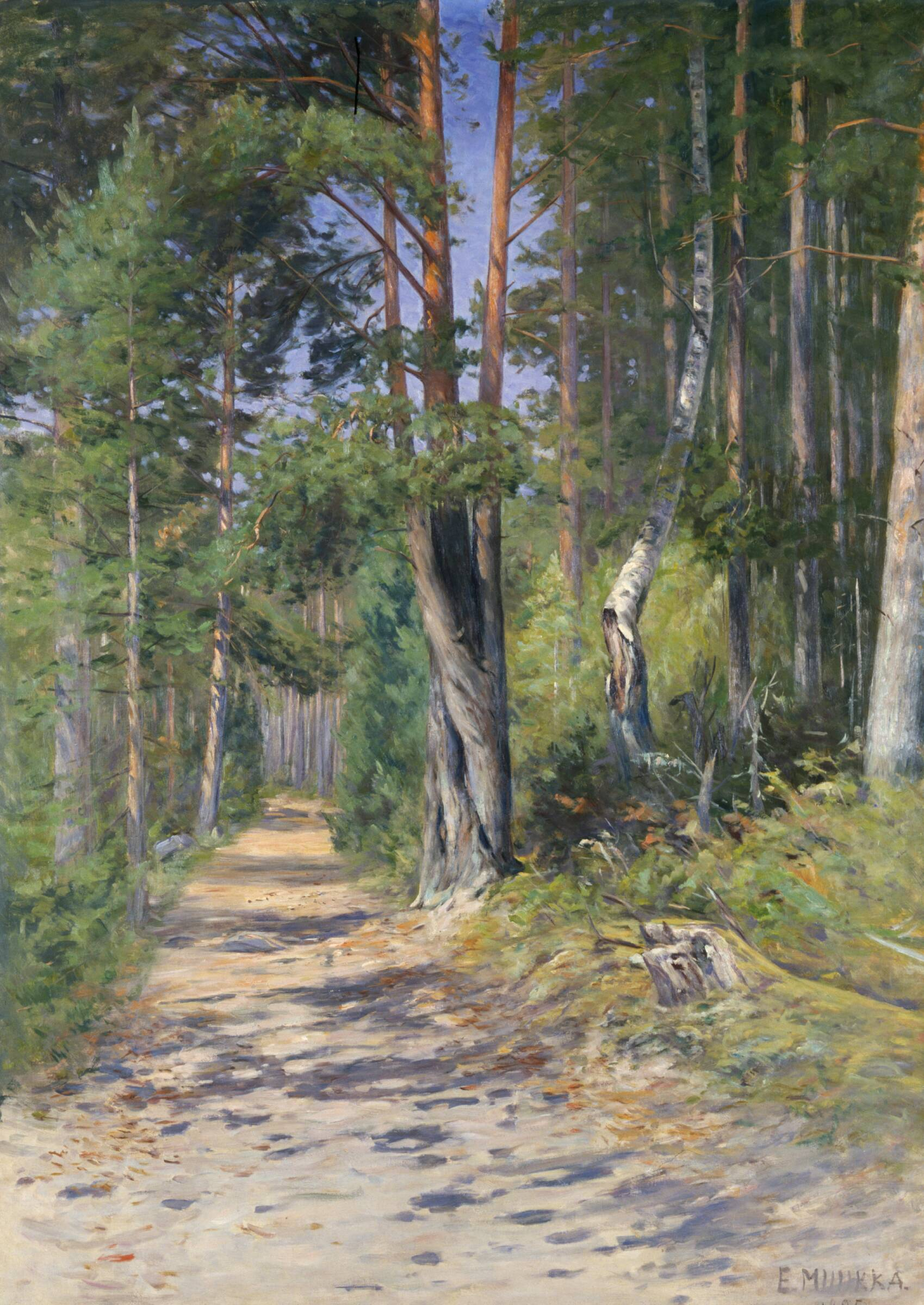
Forest Landscape, 1895

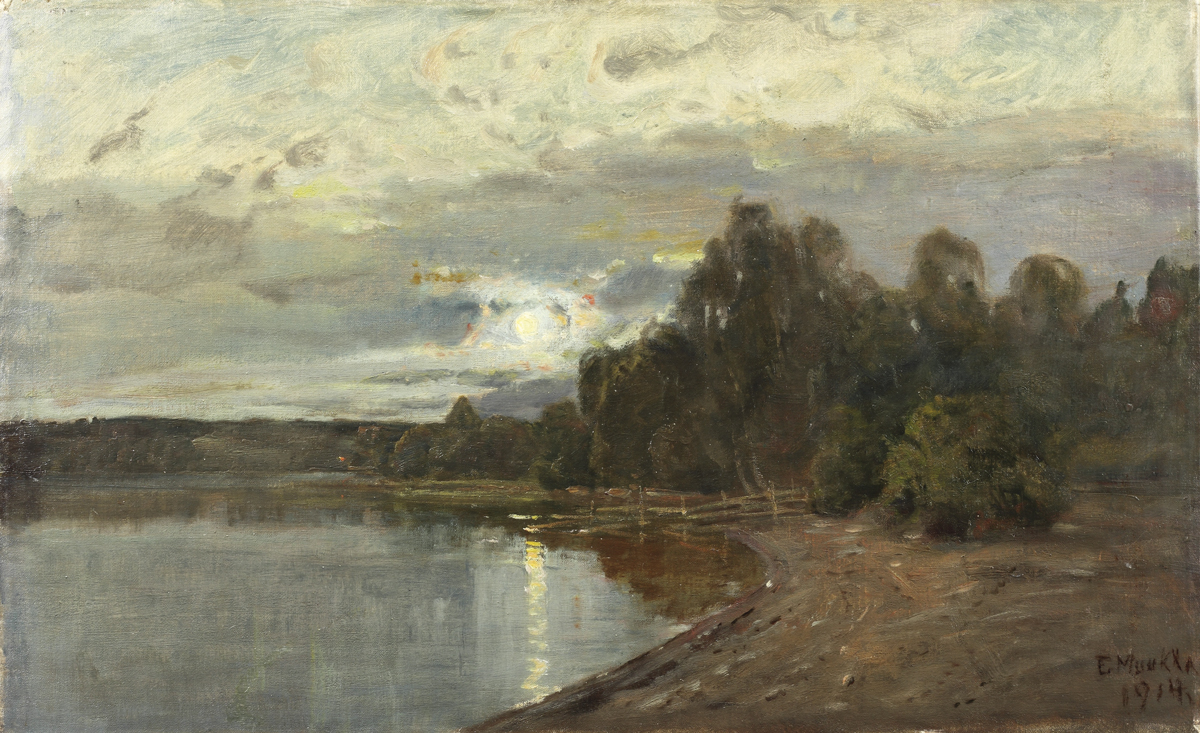
Moonlit Landscape, 1914

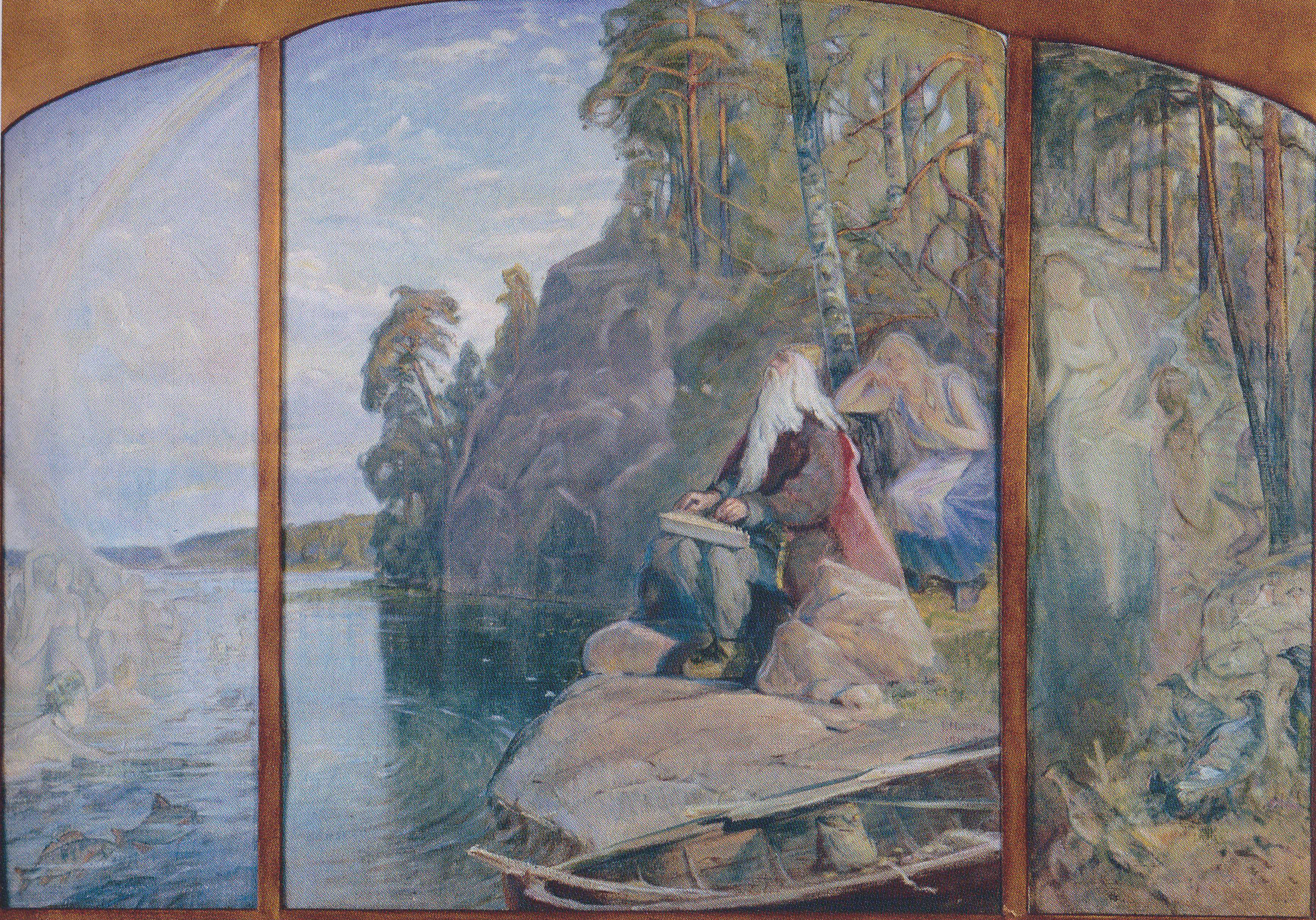
Väinämöinen's play, triptych from 1914

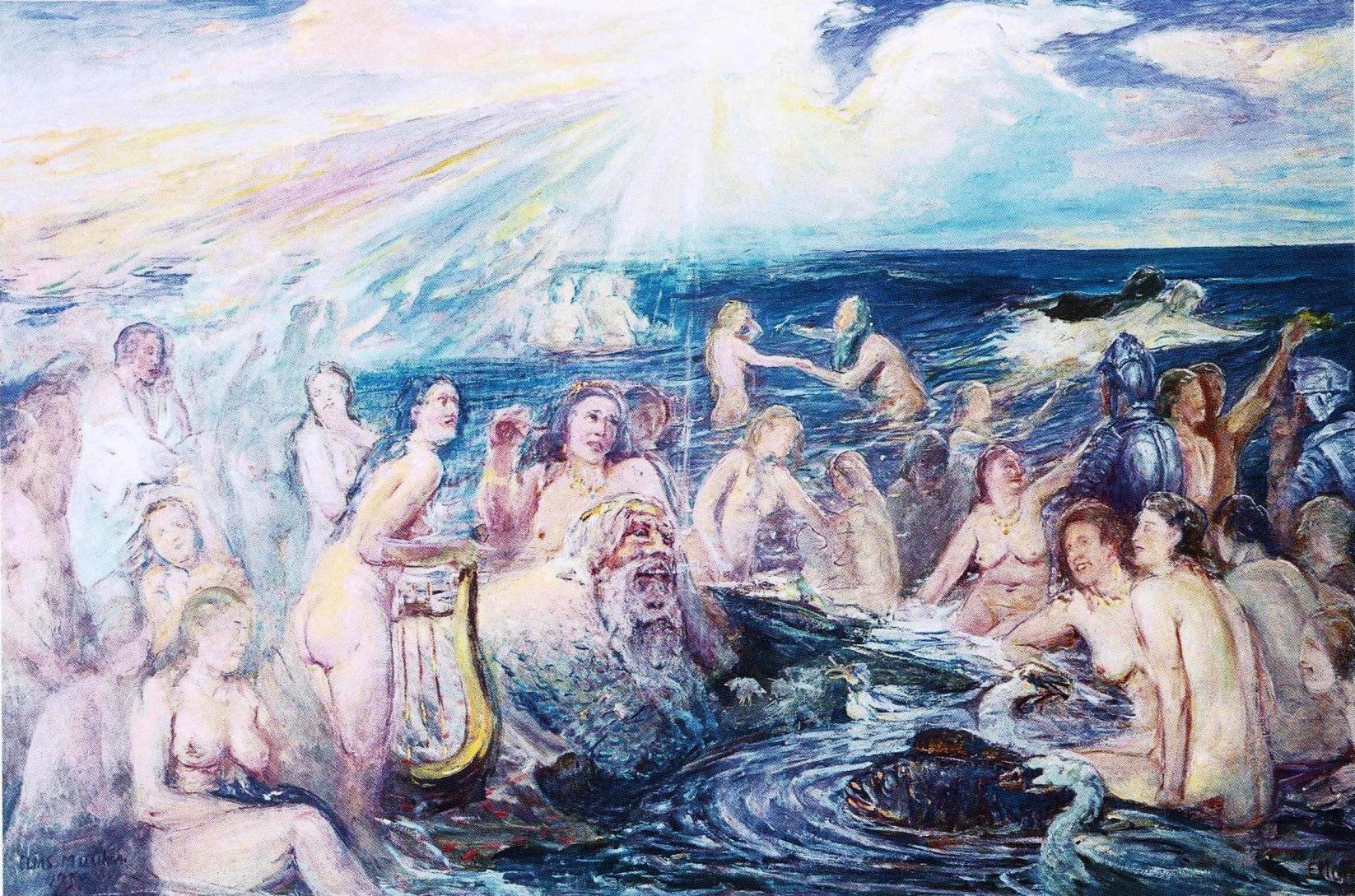
In the Kingdom of Ahti, 1934
(Ahti is the Finnish god of waters)

== See also ==
- Golden Age of Finnish Art
- Finnish art
