= Victor Westerholm =

Finnish landscape painter (1860–1919)

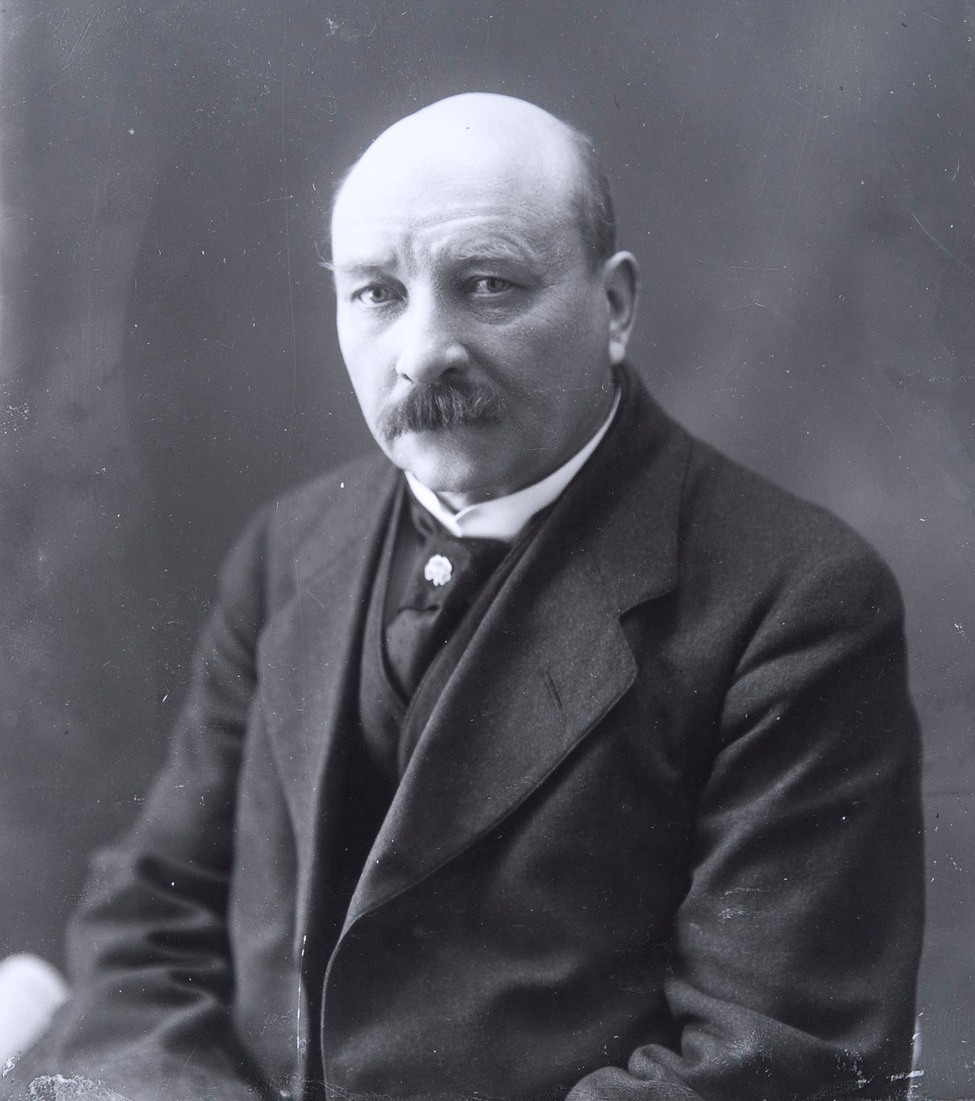
- Westerholm in 1914–1917
- Born: Victor Axel Westerholm; 4 January 1860; Turku, Grand Duchy of Finland, Russian Empire (now Finland)
- Died: 19 November 1919 (aged 59); Turku, Finland
- Known for: Painting

Victor Axel Westerholm (4 January 1860 Turku – 19 November 1919 Turku) was a Finnish landscape painter, especially known for founding the Önningeby artists' colony.

== Biography ==
Victor Axel Westerholm was born in Turku in 1860. He was the son of Viktor Westerholm, a ship's master, and Maria Westerholm (née Andersson). As a child he spent a lot of time at the island of Nagu in the Finnish Archipelago. From 1869 to 1878 he studied at the Finnish Art Society's Drawing School in Turku, under Robert Wilhelm Ekman (1808–1873) and Thorsten Waenerberg (1846–1917); and as a young man he studied under Eugen Dücker (1841–1916) in Düsseldorf from 1878-1880. Much later he studied under Jules Joseph Lefebvre(1836–1911) at the Académie Julian in Paris from 1888-1890.

In 1888 he became a teacher at the school of the Society of Art in Turku, and in 1891 became the director of the Turku art museum.

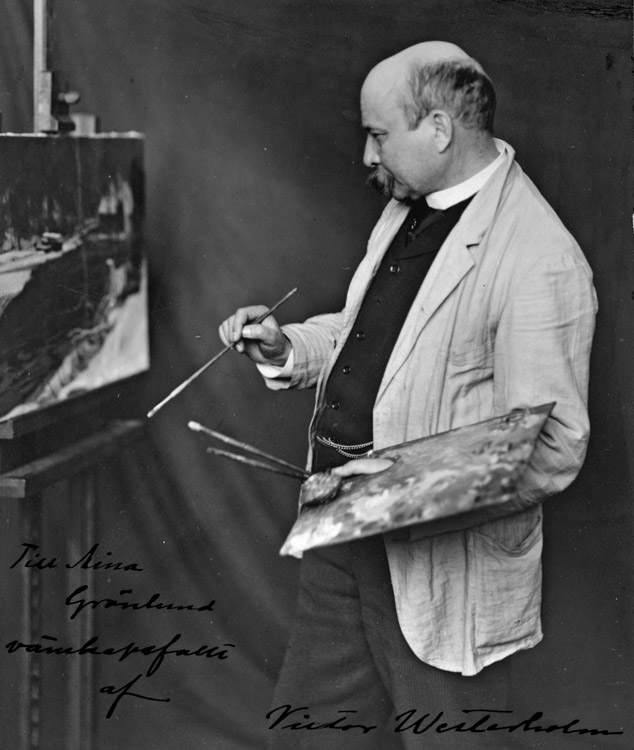
Painting in 1907

In 1880 he first time visited Åland Islands and subsequently returned there almost every summer. He often painted winter landscapes and sunsets at his summer home, "Tomtebo", bought in 1884 at the village of Önningeby in the Municipality of Jomala on Åland in the Baltic Sea. A studio has also been built there. After completing his studies in Düsseldorf in 1886, he invited Fredrik Ahlstedt, Hanna Rönnberg and Elin Danielson to the newly acquired Tomtebo by the Lemström canal, thus beginning the Önningeby artists' colony (Önningebykolonin). Several artists arrived to Ålands that summer. Visiting artists who spent time in Önningeby include J.A.G. Acke, Hanna Rönnberg, Elin Danielson-Gambogi, Edvard Westman and Elias Muukka. J.A.G. Acke also became his close, life-long friend. Since 1992 Önningeby-museet in Önningeby has exhibited a permanent exhibition of works by the Önningeby artists’ colony.

Westerholm was an instructor at Turku drawing school in 1887–1898 and 1904–1917. In 1891, he was elected as the curator of the newly formed Art Association in Turku.

== Personal life ==
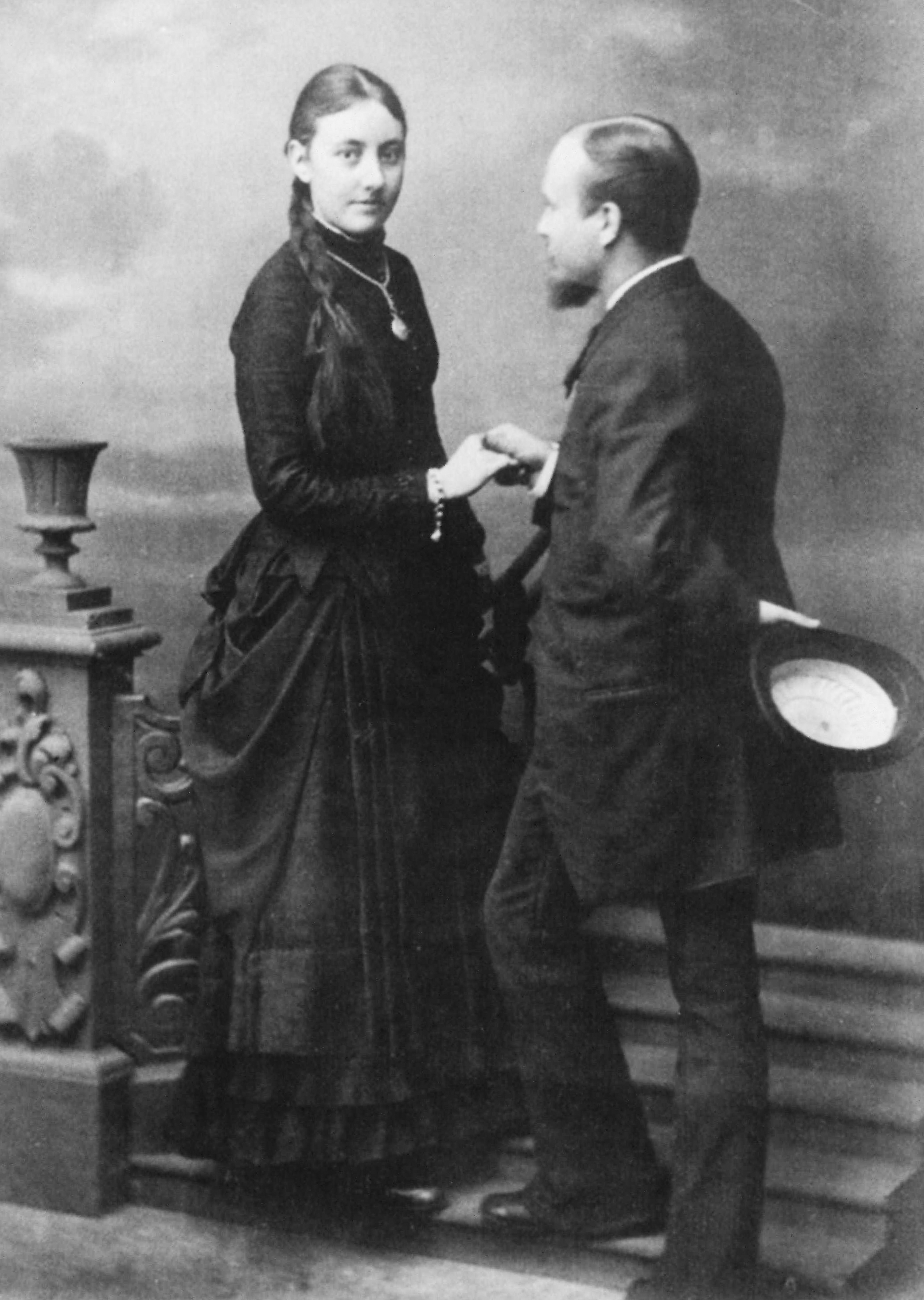
With his wife Hilma in 1884

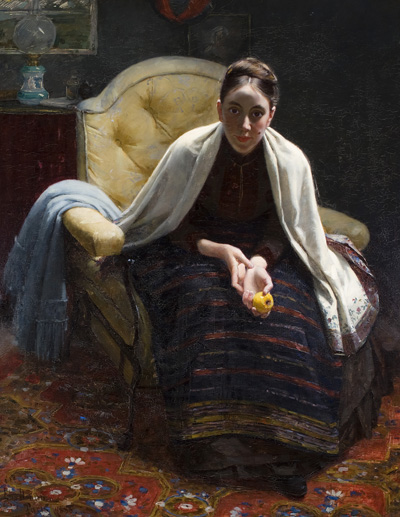
Portrait of his wife Hilma by Elin Danielson-Gambogi, 1888 (Note: The painting won a bronze medal at the Exposition Universelle of 1889.)

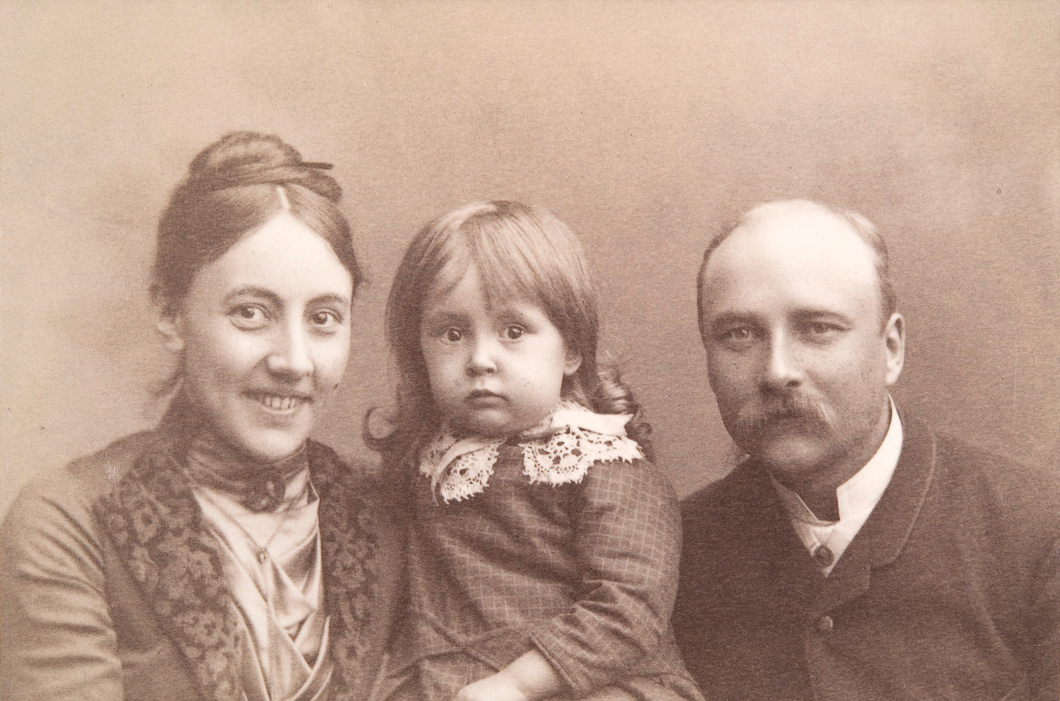
With their daughter Greta in 1889

In 1885, he married Hilma Alander, whom he met at a dancing course in Turku. She was not a painter, but Victor encouraged her to take courses at the Turku Drawing School. They had three daughters and two sons. One daughter, Greta Westerholm, was born in Ålands. Westerholm lived in Turku where he died in November 1919 from a flu that turned into pneumonia.

He was calm and thoughtful but also had a good sense of humour. Together with his wife they were rather hospitable hosts on Önningeby. He preferred freedom to paint, but still accepted students and provided instructions at the colony, keeping silence in case he was unsatisfied with a student's work.

== Memory ==
A monument, dedicated to Victor Westerholm, designed by his student Wäinö Aaltonen, was envailed by Lemström Canal near his summer house Tomtebo in 1960.

== Works ==
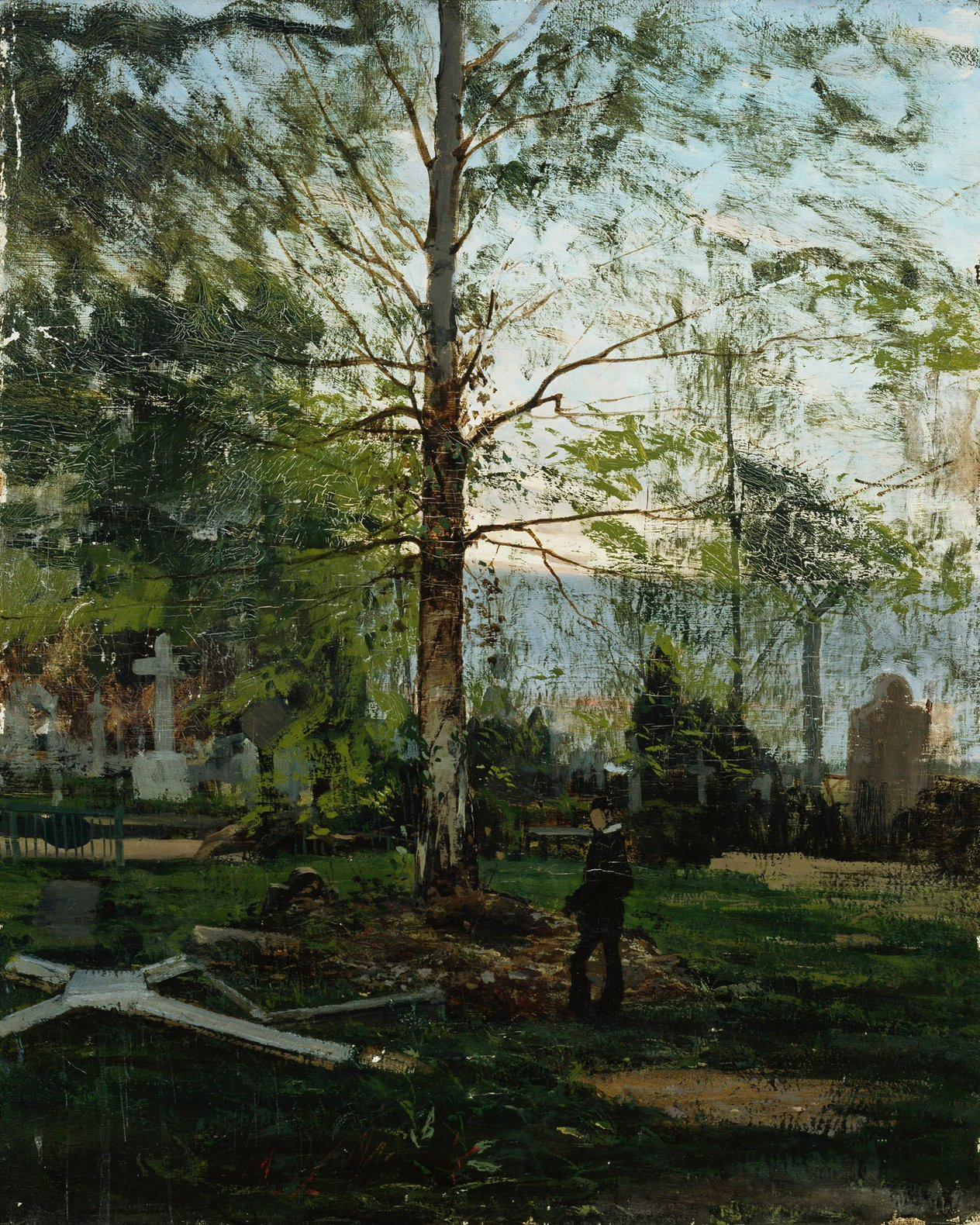
Werner Holmberg's Graveside, 1882

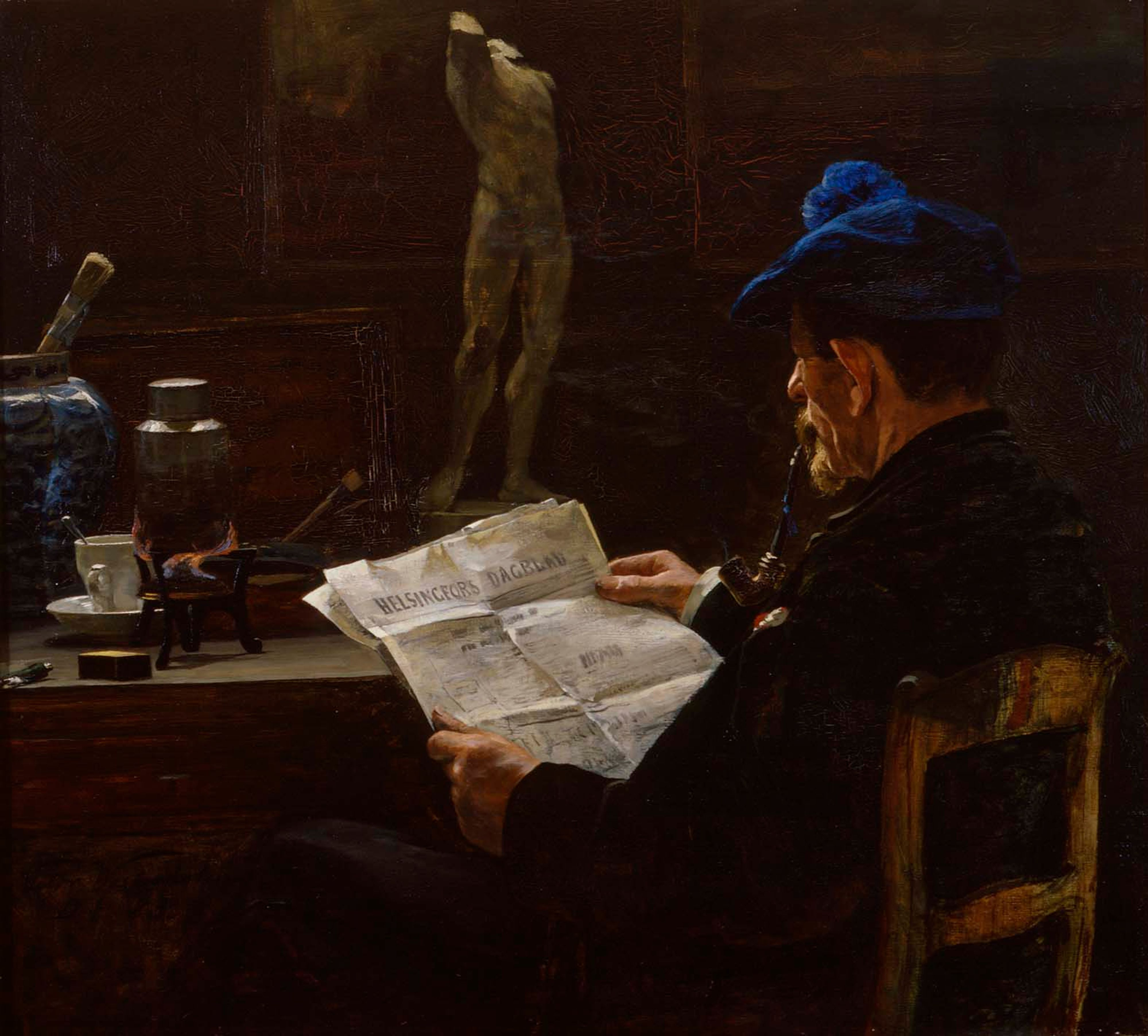
In the Studio, 1883

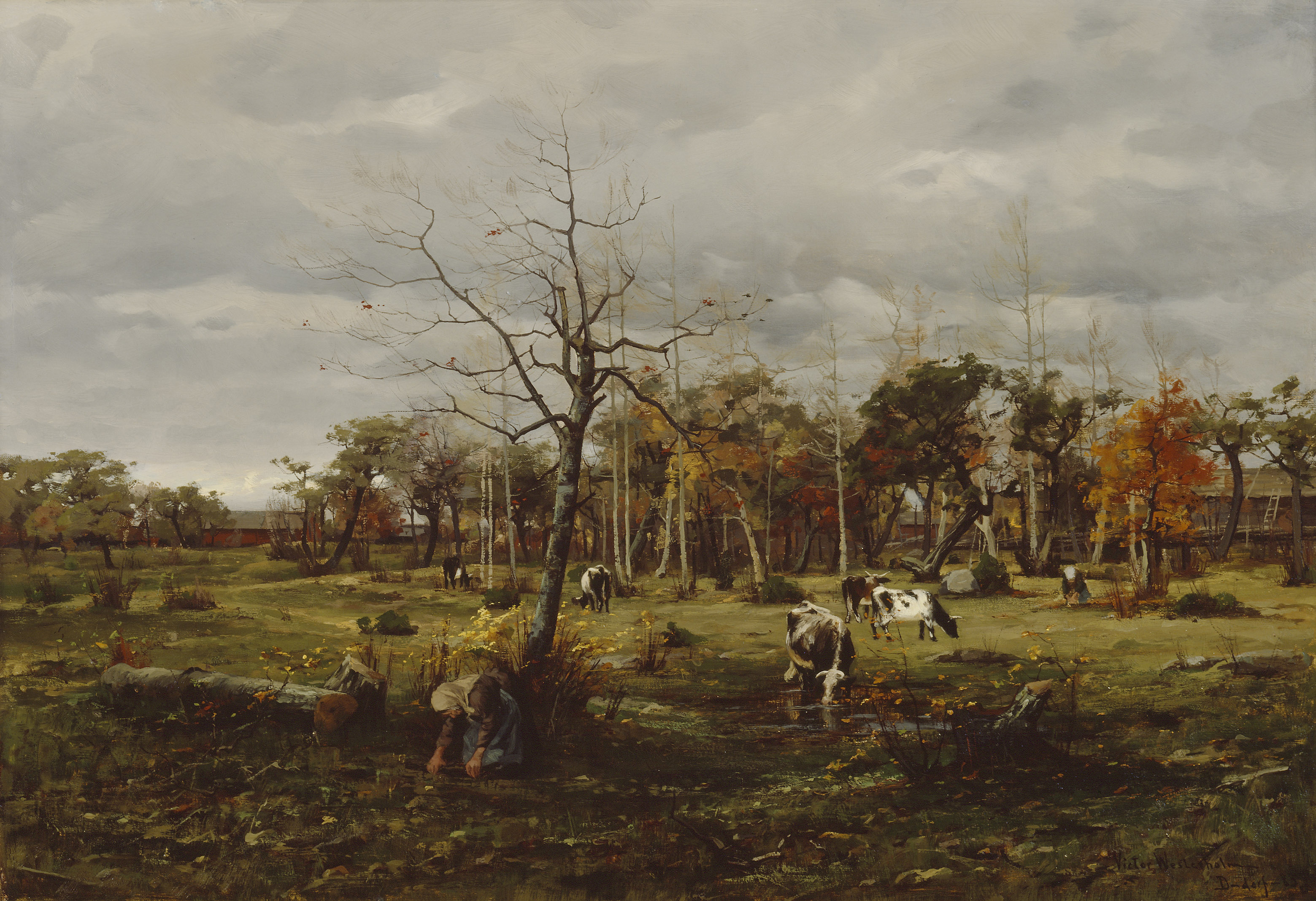
Autumn Landscape, 1883

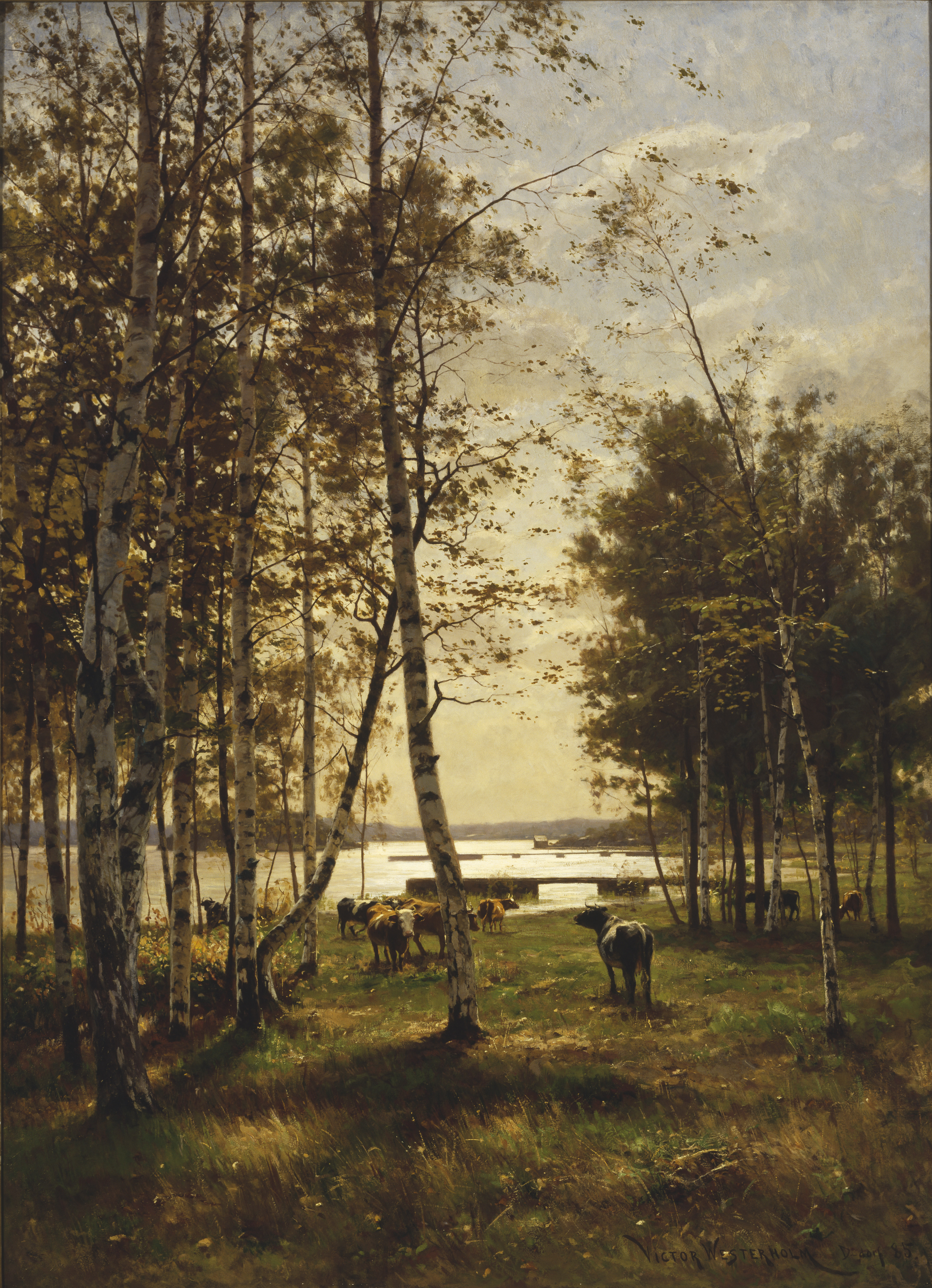
An October Day in Åland, 1885

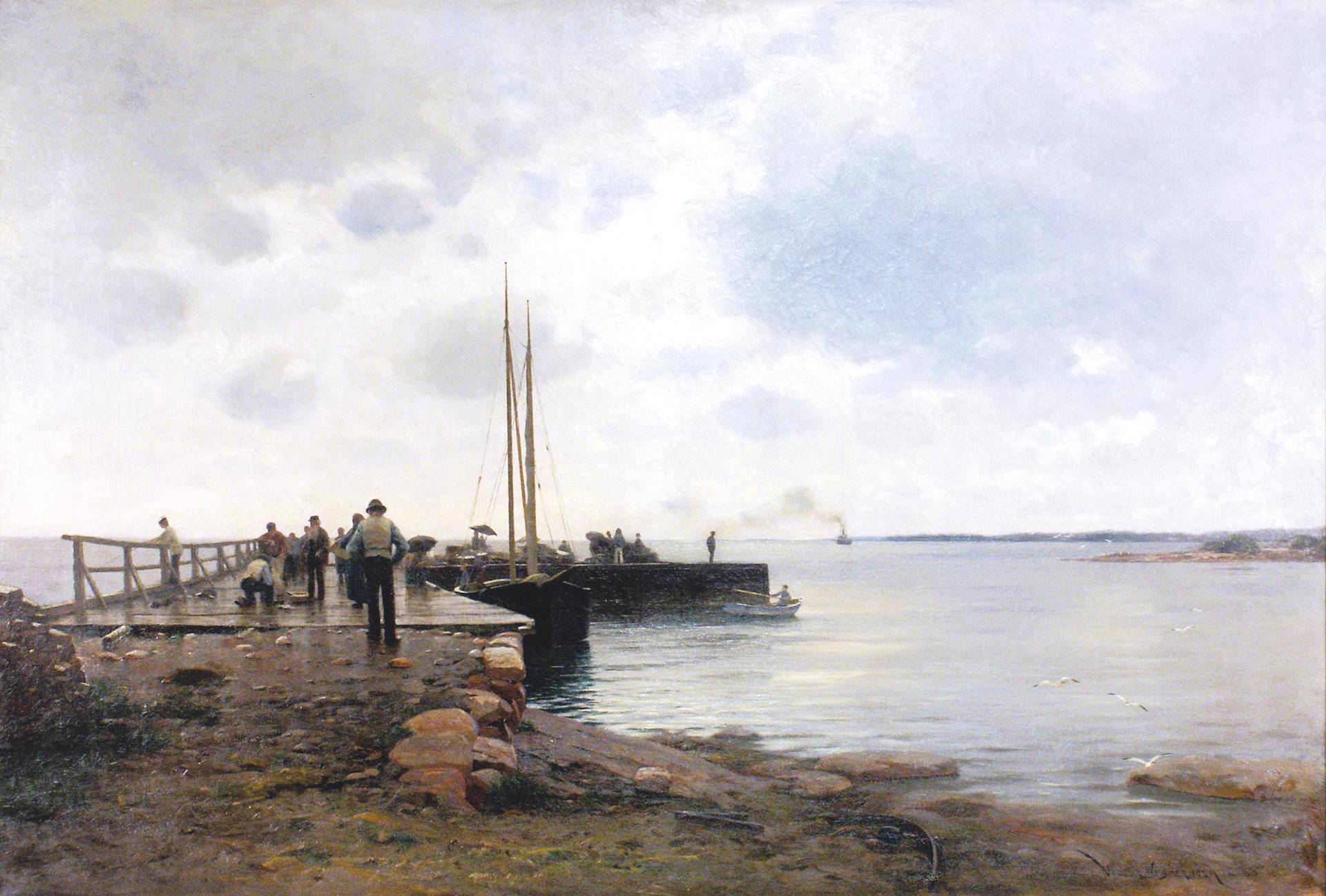
Eckerö Post Quay, 1885 (fi)

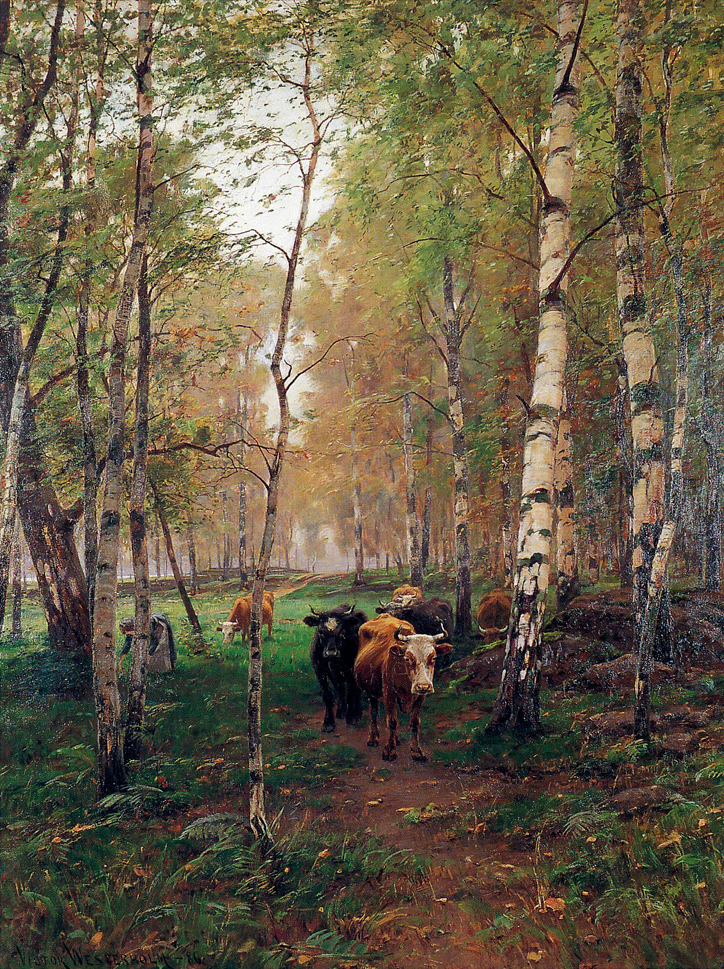
Cows in a Birch Forest, 1886

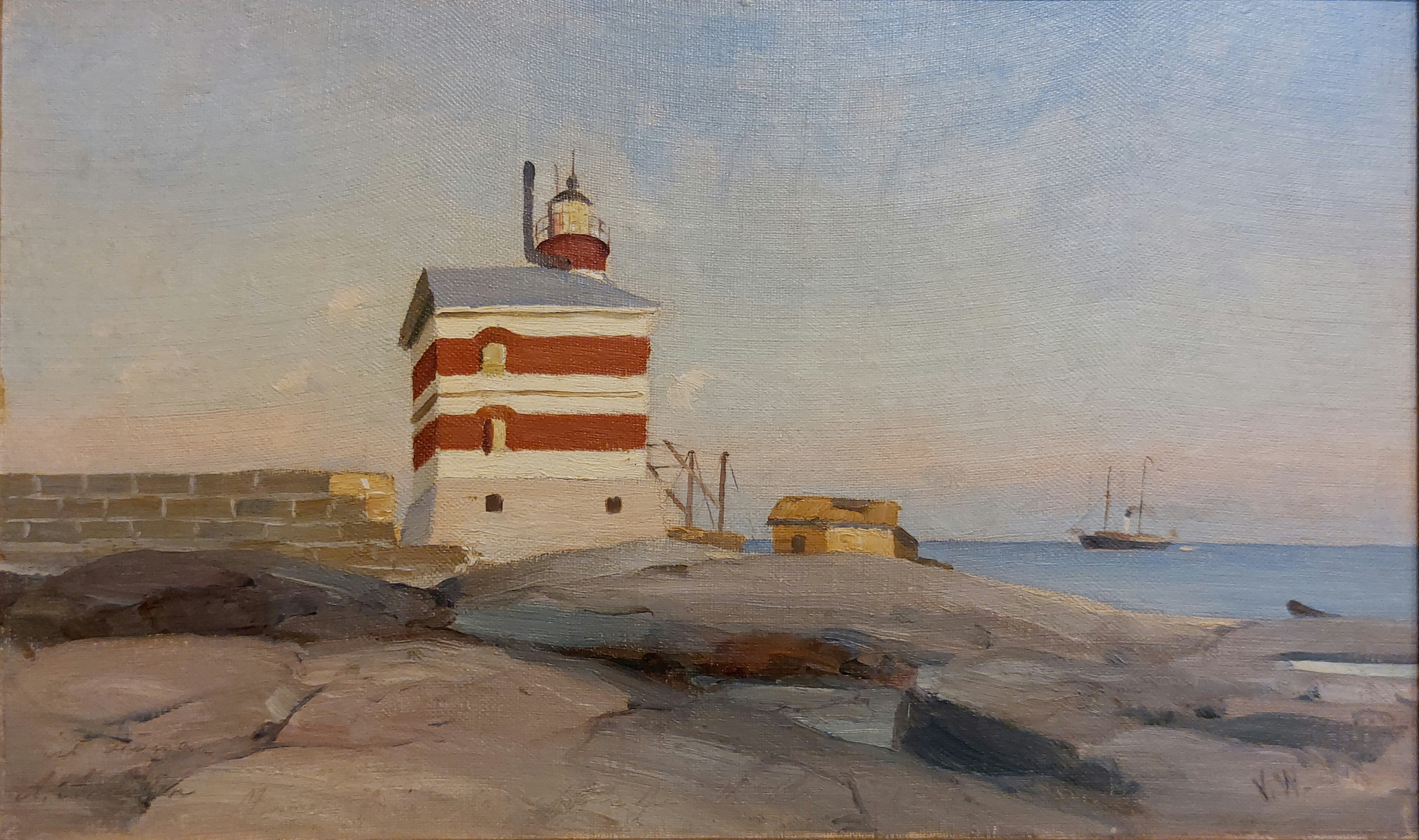
Märket lighthouse, 1887

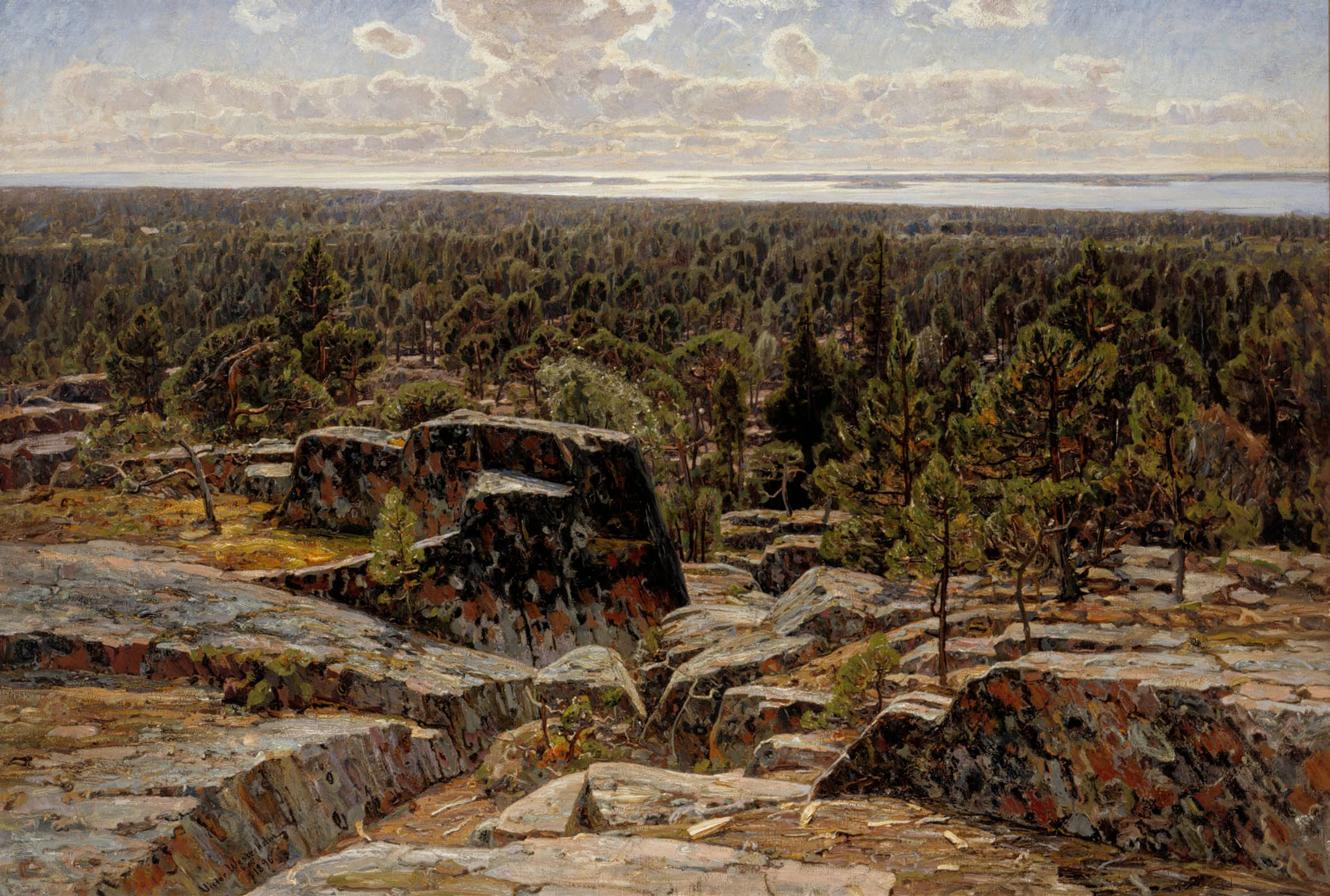
Landscape from Åland, 1895

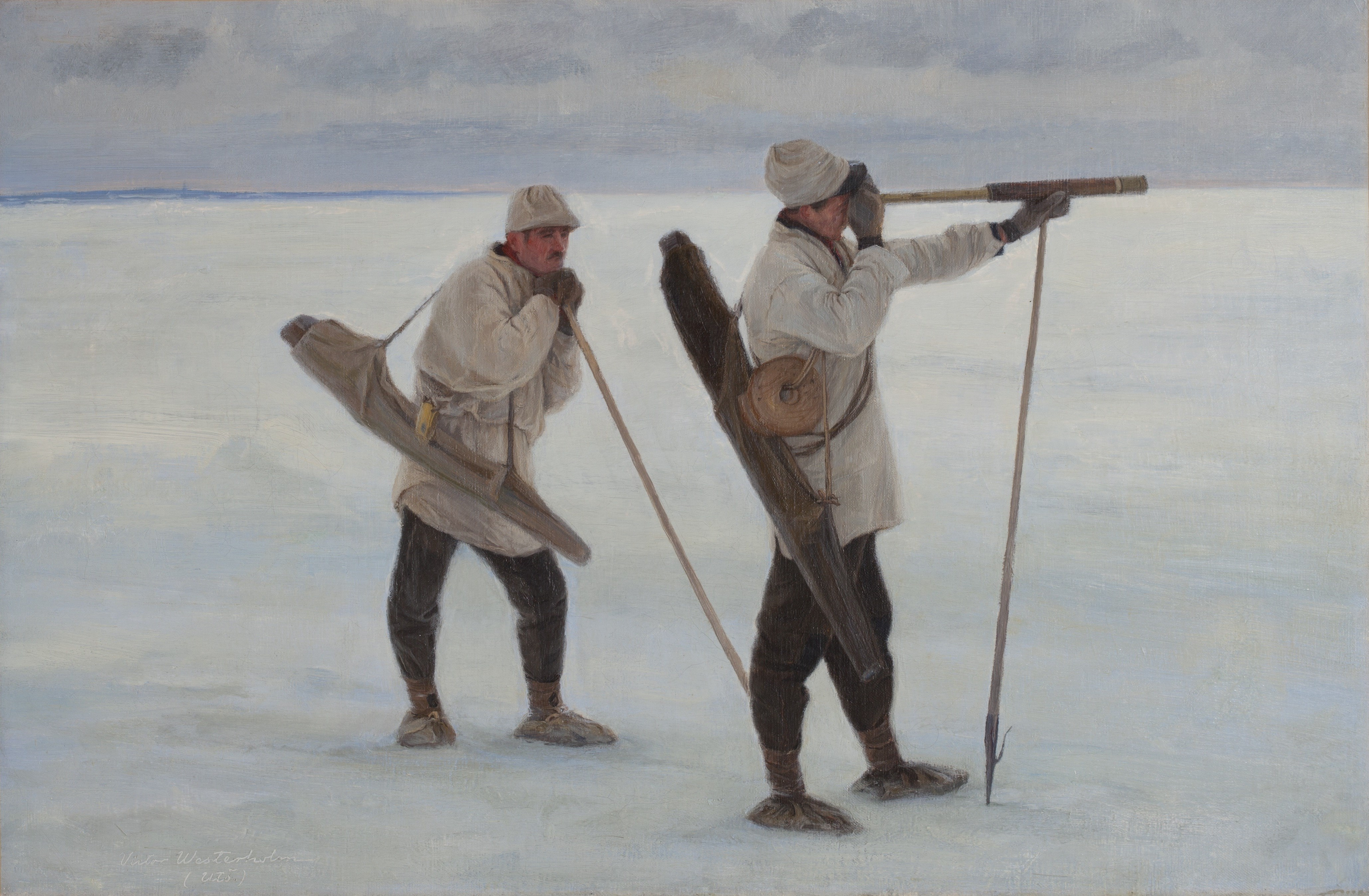
Seal Hunting, 1900

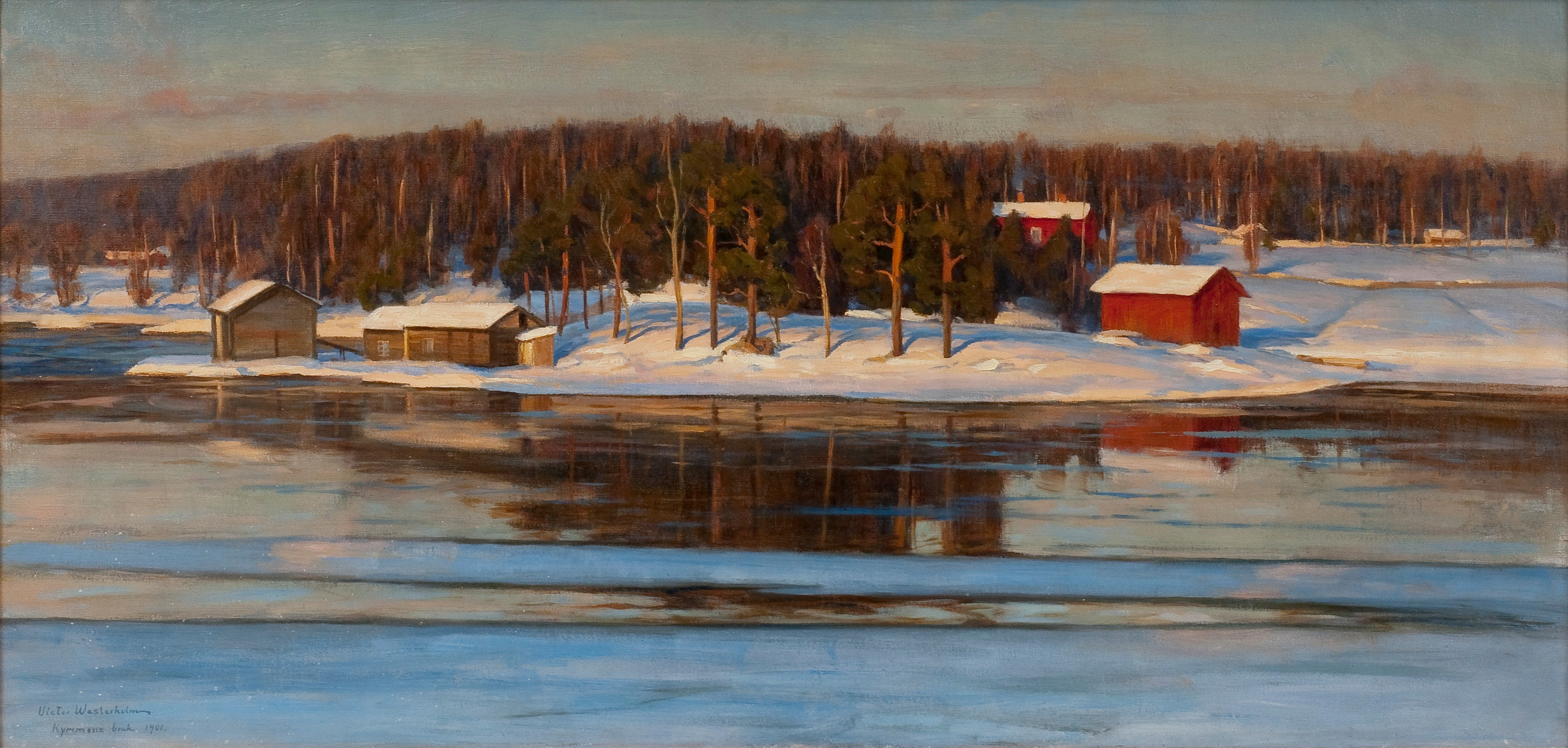
Evening Sun, 1901

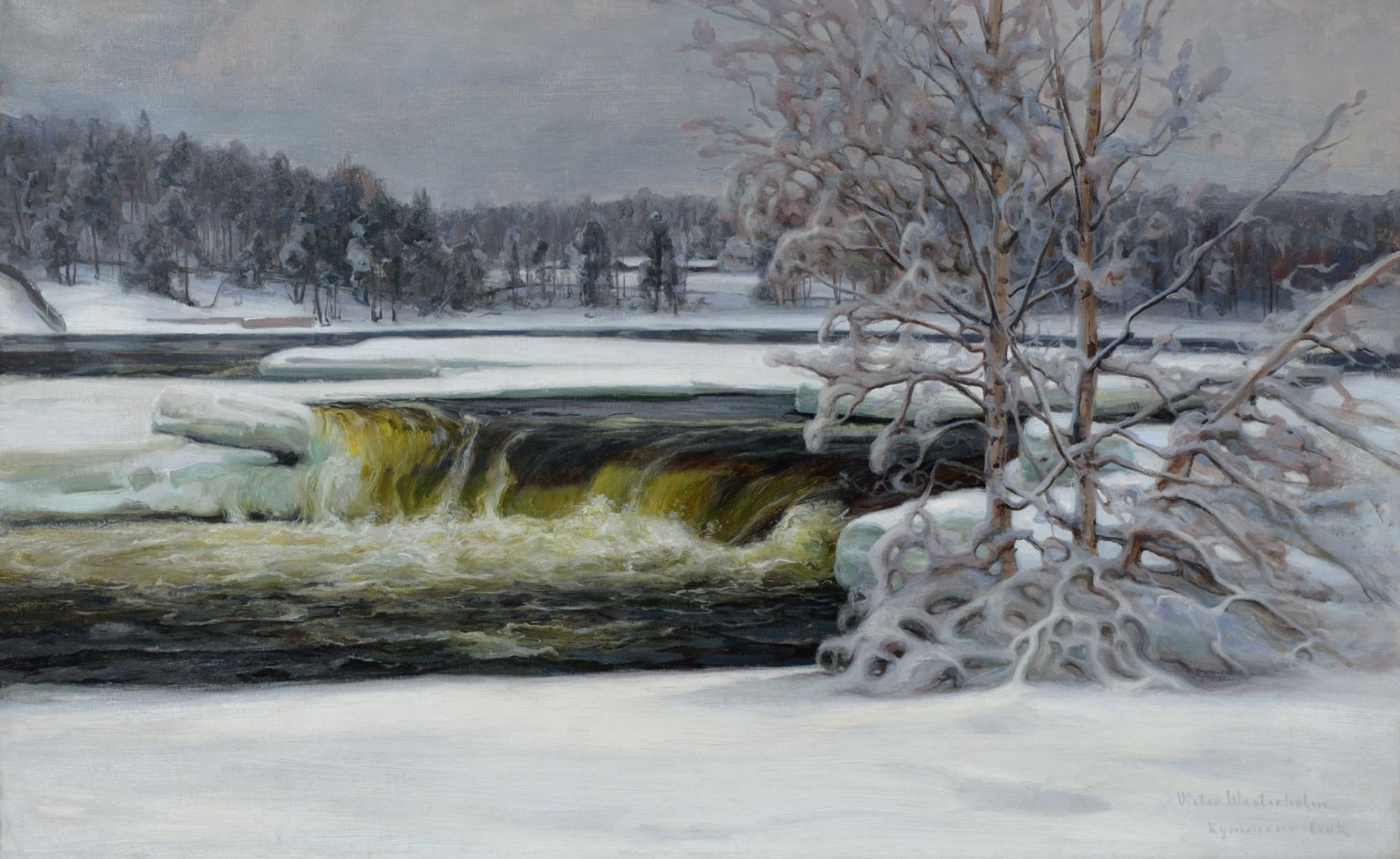
Kymi River, 1902

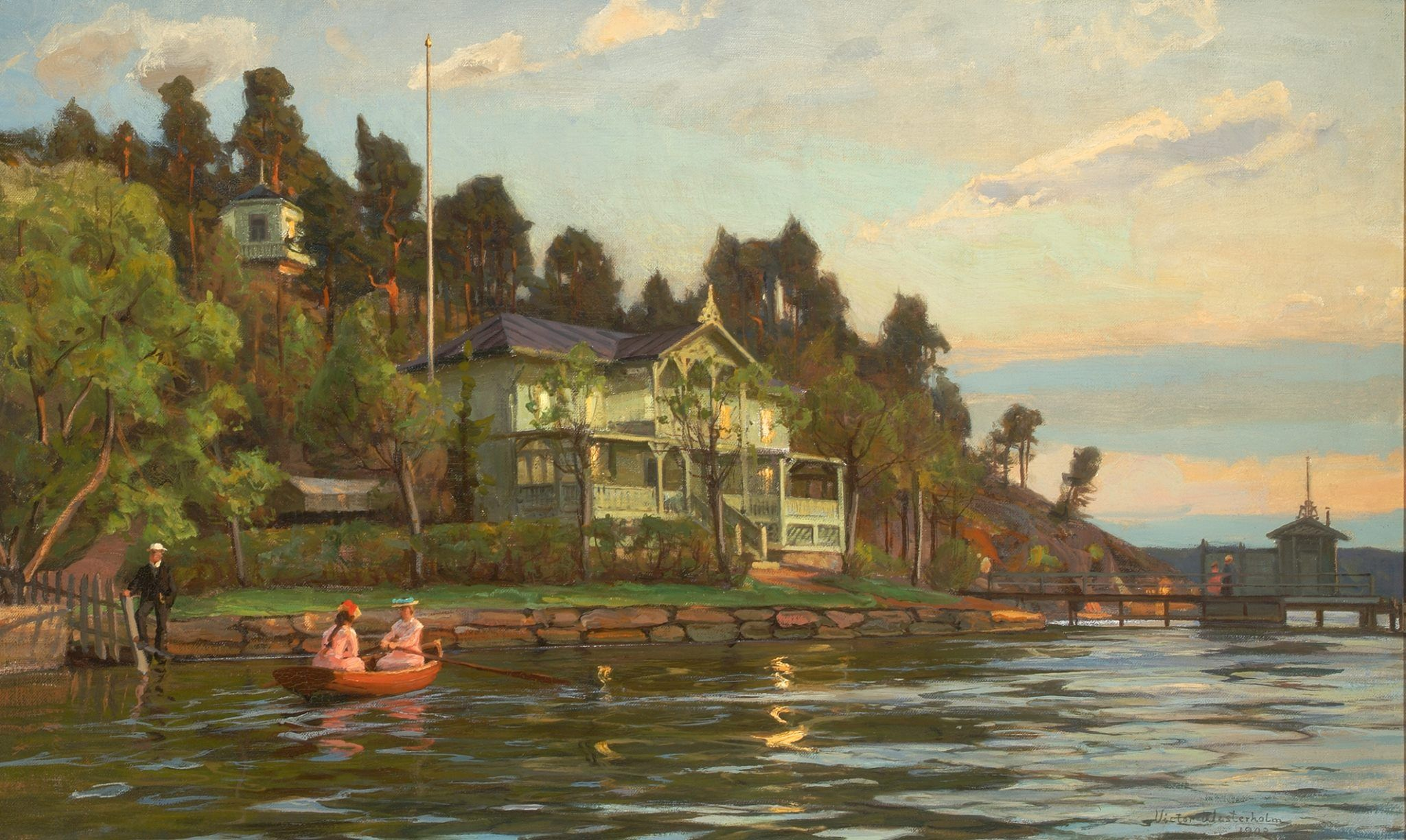
Scene from Hirvensalo, 1903

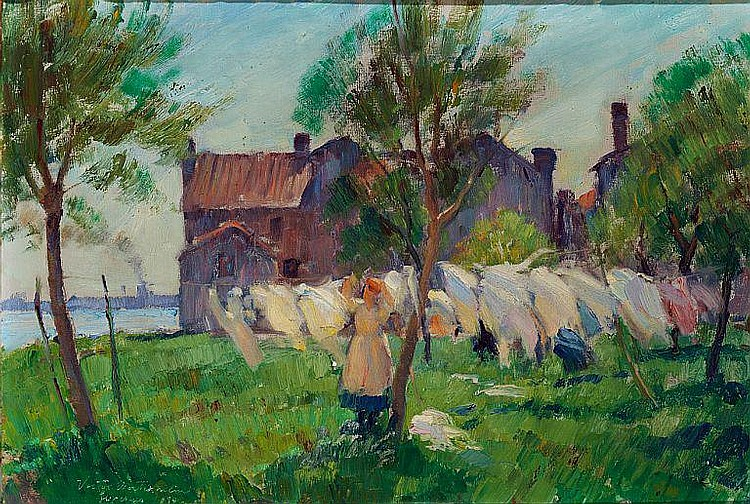
Drying Laundry in the Sun, 1900s

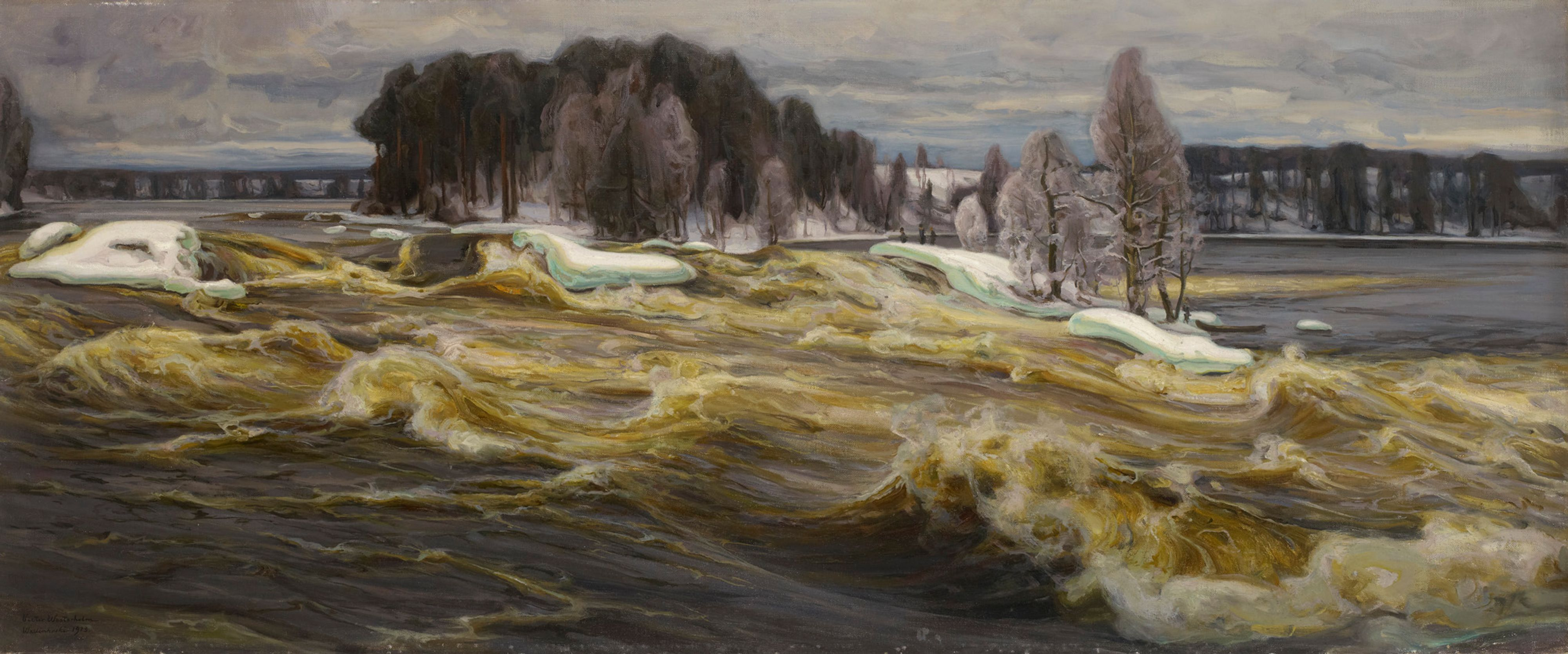
Vallinkoski Rapids, 1917 (fi)

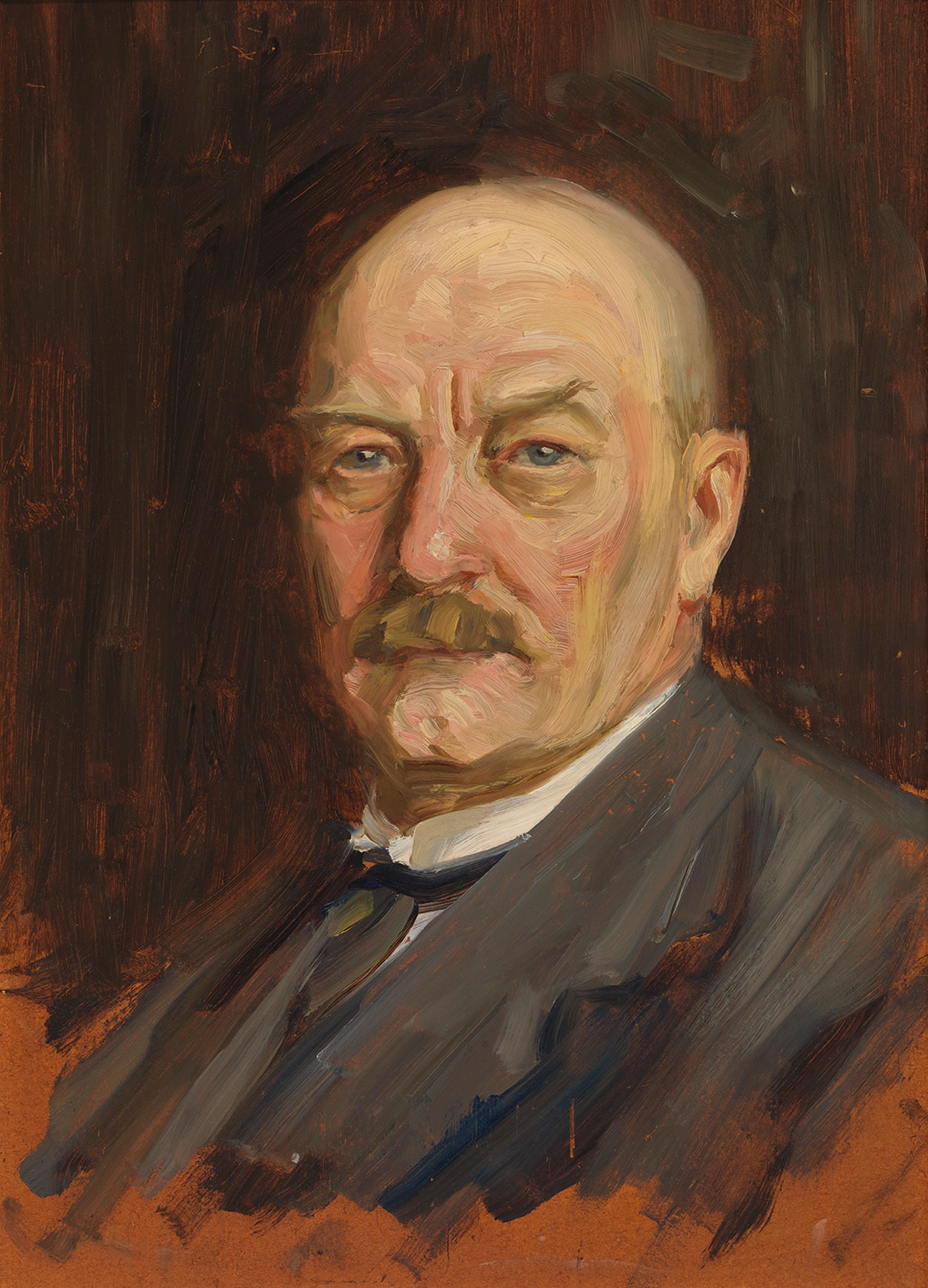
Self-Portrait, 1919

== See also ==
- Golden Age of Finnish Art
- Finnish art
