= Önningeby =

Village in Jomala Municipality on the Finnish island of Åland

Coordinates: 60.1167°N 20.0167°E

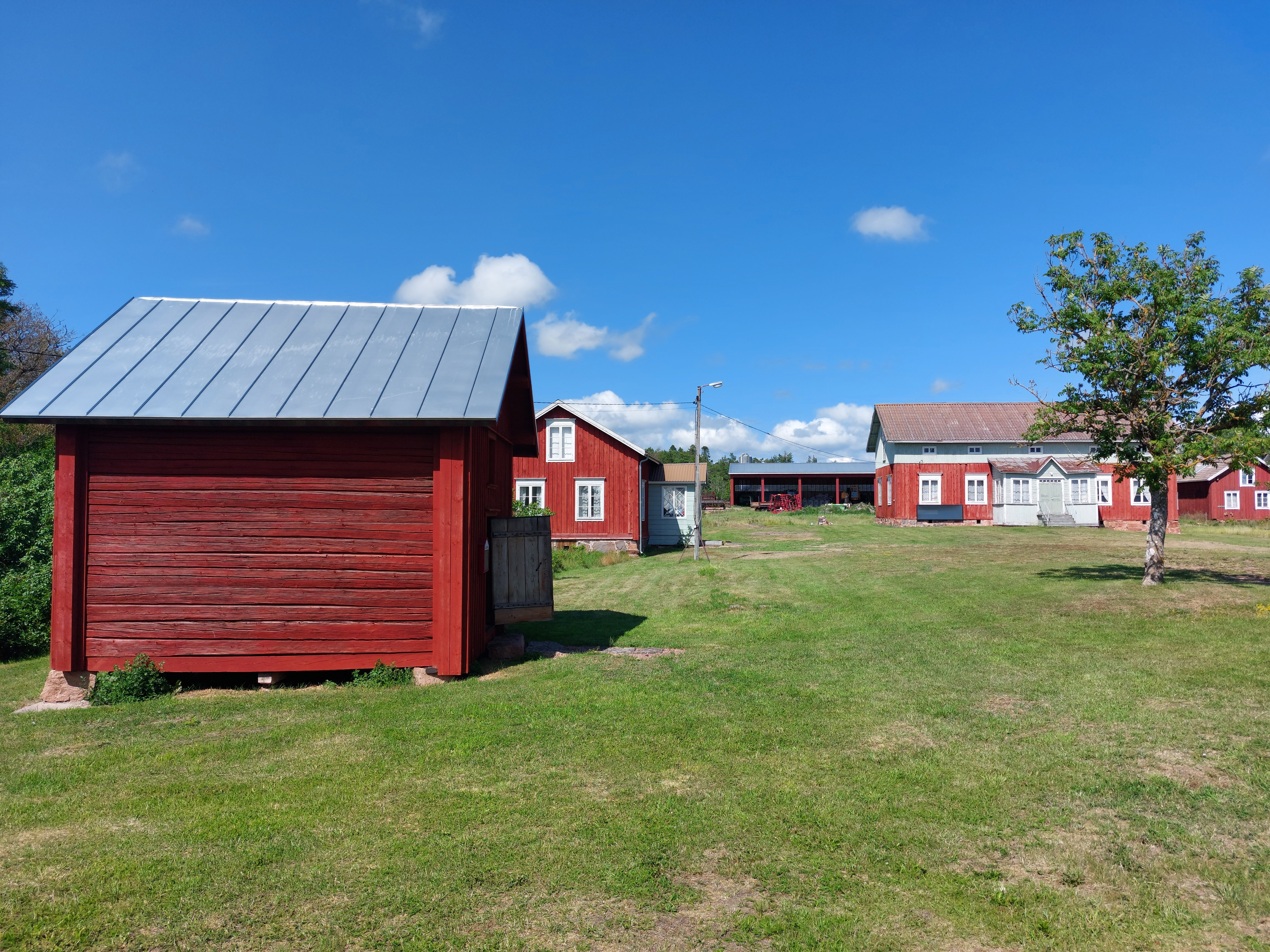
View of Önningeby village from Önningeby museum

Önningeby is a village in Jomala Municipality on the Finnish island of Åland. It is located some 7 km (4 mi) northeast of Mariehamn. Önningeby has 214 inhabitants (2014). In the south of Önningeby, Lemström's canal separates the municipalities of Jomala and Lemland.

In the late 19th century, Önningeby became popular with artists wishing to practice painting en plein air, i.e in the open air rather than in their studios. The Önningeby artists colony was centred around the summer house bought by the Finnish landscape painter Victor Westerholm in 1884, and called by him Tomtebo. Since 1992, Ålands Konstmuseum (Åland's Art Museum) has presented a permanent exhibition of works by the artists who painted there.

Presence of the artists' colony had a measurable impact on the village's life, not only culturally. Housing of visiting artists provided additional activity and income for the local inhabitants.

The artists' colony dispersed at the beginning of the World War I, when Westerholm abandoned Tomtebo. He returned there only in 1918, which still remains the family summer house.

Lemström Canal was built in 1882. It significantly reduced the travel time between Turku and Mariehamn. In 1960 a monument of Victor Westerholm was designed by Wäinö Aaltonen in a park near the canal.

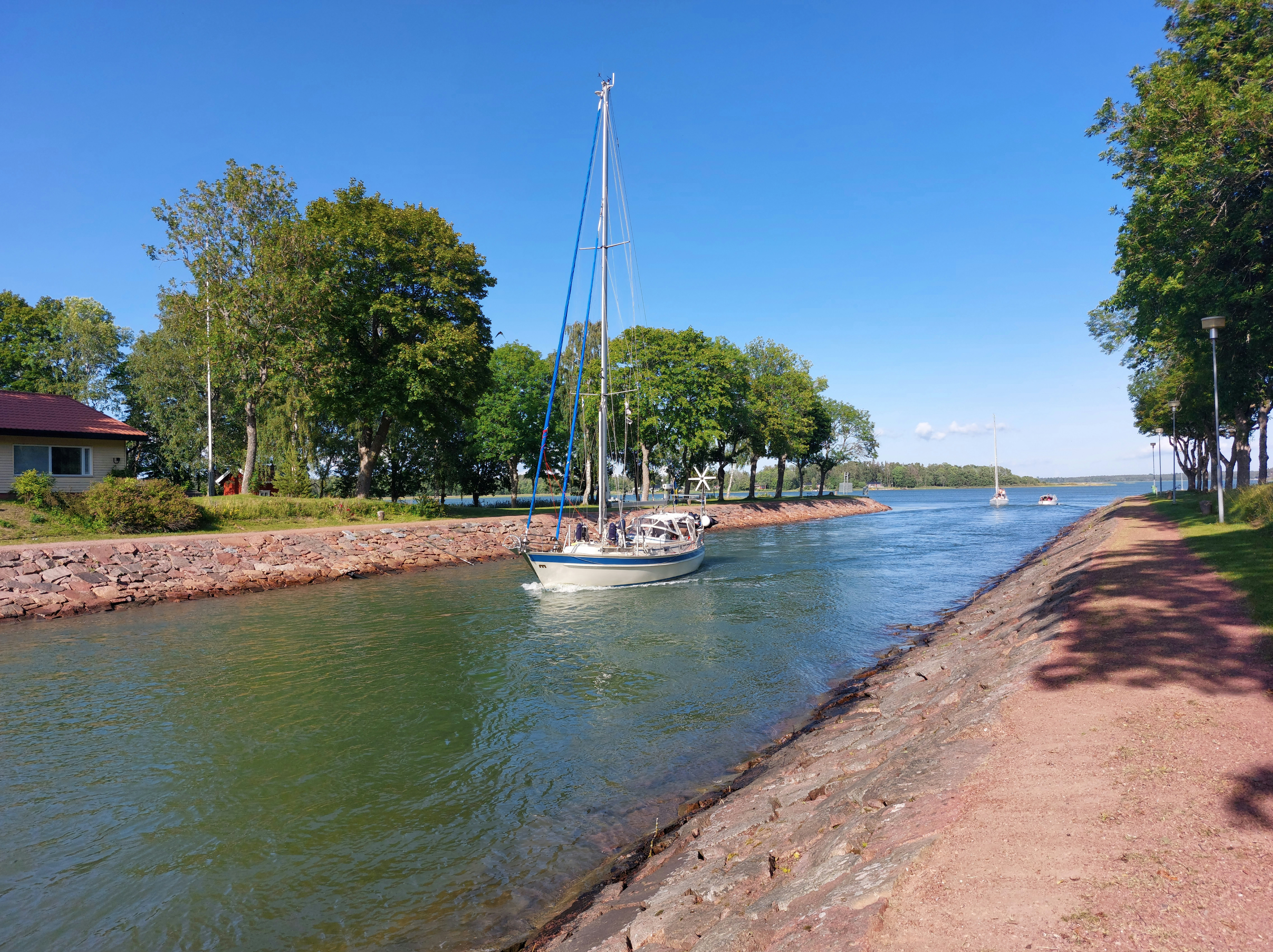
Lemström Canal
