= Hell's Kitchen (American TV series) season 21 =

Season of television series

Hell's Kitchen: Battle of the Ages
- Season 21
- Promotional poster for season 21, featuring host Ramsay
- Hosted by: Gordon Ramsay
- No. of contestants: 18
- Winner: Alex Belew
- Runner-up: Dafne Mejia
- No. of episodes: 16

Release
- Original network: Fox
- Original release: September 29, 2022 – February 9, 2023

Season chronology
- ← Previous; Young Guns Next → The American Dream

The twenty-first season of the American competitive reality television series Hell's Kitchen (subtitled as Hell's Kitchen: Battle of the Ages) premiered on Fox on September 29, 2022, and concluded on February 9, 2023. Gordon Ramsay returned as host and head chef, while Christina Wilson returned as the Red Team's sous-chef and Jason Santos returned as the Blue Team's sous-chef. Matthew Childs and Marino Monferrato both returned as maître d'; Matthew temporarily filled in for Marino in the first nine episodes while Marino was visiting family in Italy.

The season was won by former restaurant owner Alex Belew, with executive chef Dafne Mejia finishing second.

== Production ==
On February 1, 2022, it was announced that the series had been renewed for a twenty-first and twenty-second season. Filming for this season began in January 2022, making this the first Hell's Kitchen season filmed following the start of the COVID-19 pandemic. On June 6, 2022, it was announced that the twenty-first season would premiere on September 29, 2022.

== Chefs ==
Eighteen chefs competed in season 21. For the third time in the show's history (following seasons one and 18), the chefs were not divided by gender at the start of the season. Instead, they were divided by age, with the "20-somethings" on the Red Team and the "40-somethings" on the Blue Team. Starting from the end of the third episode, the teams were divided by gender, with women on the red team and men on the blue team.

=== "20-Somethings" ===
| Contestant | Age | Occupation | Hometown | Result |
|---|---|---|---|---|
| Dafne Mejia | 29 | Executive chef | Los Angeles, California | Runner-up |
| Alejandro Najar | 28 | Head chef | Barberton, Ohio | Eliminated during Finals |
| Sommer Sellers | 24 | Lead line cook | Brooklyn, New York | Eliminated after eleventh service |
| Cheyenne Nichols | 21 | Sous-chef | Spencer, Ohio | Eliminated after tenth service |
| Sakari Smithwick | 27 | Pop-up chef | Amityville, New York | Eliminated before Black Jackets |
| Brett Binninger-Schwartz | 24 | Executive chef | Dublin, Ohio | Eliminated after ninth service |
| Vlad Briantsev | 26 | Sous-chef | Chicago, Illinois | Eliminated after seventh service |
| Ileana D'Silva | 23 | Sous-chef | Gloucester, Virginia | Eliminated after "Cook for your life" challenge |
| Alyssa Osinga | 23 | Executive chef | Chicago, Illinois | Eliminated after fifth service |

=== "40-Somethings" ===
| Contestant | Age | Occupation | Hometown | Result |
|---|---|---|---|---|
| Alex Belew | 40 | Former restaurant owner | Murfreesboro, Tennessee | Winner |
| Tara Ciannella | 41 | Private chef/caterer | Congers, New York | Eliminated before Black Jackets |
| Abe Sanchez | 41 | Executive chef | Houston, Texas | Eliminated after eighth service |
| Mindy Livengood | 42 | Caterer | Liberty Township, Ohio | Eliminated after sixth service |
| Billy Trudsoe | 40 | Head chef | Melbourne, Florida | Eliminated after fifth service |
| Nicole Gomez | 46 | Private chef | Los Angeles, California | Eliminated after third service |
| O'Shay Lolley | 44 | Executive chef | New Castle, Delaware | Eliminated after second service |
| Zeus Gordiany | 48 | Executive chef | Milford, Delaware | Quit after first service |
| Charlene Sherman | 40 | Private chef | Worland, Wyoming | Eliminated after first service |

== Contestant progress ==
| No. | Chef | Original teams | | | 1st switch | | | | | 2nd switch | | 3rd switch | | Individuals | | | Finals |
| No. | Chef | 2101/2102 | | 2103 | 2104 | 2105 | 2106 | 2107 | 2108 | 2109 | 2110 | 2111 | 2112 | 2113 | 2114 | 2115/2116 | |
|---|---|---|---|---|---|---|---|---|---|---|---|---|---|---|---|---|---|
| 1 | Alex | BoB | LOSE | LOSE | WIN | LOSE | LOSE | WIN | NOM | LOSE | LOSE | WIN | IN | IN | IN | IN | WINNER |
| 2 | Dafne | NOM (Note: Chef was nominated by the BoB (Best of the Best) as one of the weakest in the "Chicken Wing" challenge) | WIN | WIN | LOSE | WIN | LOSE | WIN | IN | LOSE | WIN | NOM | IN | NOM | IN | IN | RUNNER UP |
| 3 | Alejandro | BoB | WIN | WIN | WIN | NOM | LOSE | WIN | NOM | NOM | LOSE | NOM | IN | IN | IN | OUT | Alex's team |
| 4 | Sommer | IN | WIN | WIN | LOSE | WIN | NOM | WIN | IN | LOSE | WIN | BoB | IN | IN | OUT | | Dafne's team |
| 5 | Cheyenne | IN | WIN | WIN | LOSE | WIN | LOSE | WIN | IN | LOSE | WIN | WIN | IN | OUT | | | Alex's team |
| 6 | Tara | IN | LOSE | LOSE | LOSE | WIN | LOSE | WIN | NOM | NOM | WIN | NOM | OUT | | | | Alex's team |
| 7 | Sakari | IN | WIN | WIN | WIN | LOSE | LOSE | NOM | IN | LOSE | NOM | BoB | OUT | | | | Dafne's team |
| 8 | Brett | IN | WIN | WIN | WIN | LOSE | LOSE | WIN | IN | NOM | WIN | OUT | | | | | Alex's team |
| 9 | Abe | IN | LOSE | LOSE | WIN | LOSE | NOM | NOM | IN | LOSE | OUT | | | | | | Dafne's team |
| 10 | Vlad | IN | WIN | WIN | WIN | NOM | LOSE | WIN | NOM | OUT | | | | | | | Dafne's team |
| 11 | Ileana | NOM | WIN | WIN | LOSE | WIN | LOSE | NOM | OUT | | | | | | | | |
| 12 | Mindy | IN | LOSE | LOSE | NOM | WIN | LOSE | OUT | | | | | | | | | |
| 13 | Alyssa | IN | WIN | WIN | NOM | WIN | OUT | | | | | | | | | | |
| 14 | Billy | NOM | NOM | LOSE | WIN | NOM | OUT | | | | | | | | | | |
| 15 | Nicole | IN | LOSE | NOM | OUT | | | | | | | | | | | | |
| 16 | O'Shay | NOM | LOSE | OUT | | | | | | | | | | | | | |
| 17 | Zeus | IN | LEFT | | | | | | | | | | | | | | |
| 18 | Charlene | IN | OUT | | | | | | | | | | | | | | |

Keywords

- WIN = Won the dinner service
- LOSE = Lost the dinner service
- BoB = Best of the Best, usually exempt from nomination
- BoW = Best of the Worst, sometimes exempt from nomination
- IN = not nominated for elimination
- NOM = nominated for elimination
- OUT = eliminated normally
- LEFT = withdrew from competition
- HOSP = eliminated due to hospitalization
- EJEC = eliminated during service

Color key
Chef was eliminated after regular nomination
Chef was eliminated after Ramsay's nomination
Chef was eliminated without nomination
Chef was eliminated from winning team
Chef was eliminated in the Cook For Your Life challenge
Chef was nominated to participate in the Cook For Your Life challenge
Chef was eliminated during service
Chef withdrew from the competition
Chef was the Best of the Best/Worst
Chef was retained after regular nomination
Chef was retained after Ramsay's nomination
Chef's nomination was voided
The winner of Hell's Kitchen
The runner-up of Hell's Kitchen

== Episodes ==
| No. overall | No. in season | Title | Original release date | Prod. code | U.S. viewers (millions) |
|---|---|---|---|---|---|
| 315 | 1 | "Let the Battle Begin" | September 29, 2022 | HK-2101 | 1.89 |
Eighteen chefs were brought to Hell's Kitchen. For the first time, the chefs were split based on age, with the 20-somethings on the Red Team and the 40-somethings on the Blue Team. Prior to the signature dish challenge, Ramsay revealed that the season's winner would become head chef at the brand-new Hell's Kitchen restaurant at Caesars Atlantic City. Team challenge/signature dish: The contestants were given 45 minutes to cook their signature dishes, with Ramsay scoring them on a scale of one-five. The challenge ended in a 31-31 tie, so Ramsay called up Alex and Sakari again, as he deemed their dishes to be the best from their respective teams. Sakari's dish was judged to have the edge, giving the twenties team the win. Reward/punishment: The twenties team enjoyed dinner with Ramsay on a yacht, while the forties team was forced to unload deliveries and clean both kitchens. Challenge – part one: In the dining room, a waiter carrying a plate of chicken wings tripped, revealing the teams' next challenge, where they would have 40 minutes to create an elevated chicken wing. Ramsay revealed that the chef with the best dish from each team would receive a punishment pass and the chef with the worst dish would be eliminated as the episode ended in a cliffhanger.
| 316 | 2 | "Just Wingin' It" | October 6, 2022 | HK-2102 | 1.84 |
Challenge – part two: Continuing from the previous episode, the chefs had 40 minutes to cook an elevated chicken wing. After the sous-chefs tasted the dishes, the blue team's top three were Zeus, Alex, and Nicole, while the red team's top three were Vlad, Cheyenne, and Alejandro. Ramsay deemed Alex and Alejandro's dishes the best and gave both a punishment pass. Then, they were tasked with naming two people from their teams who had the weakest dishes. Alejandro nominated Ileana and Dafne, while Alex nominated O’Shay and Billy. Ramsay deemed Ileana's dish the worst for having raw chicken, but just as he was about to eliminate her, she convinced him to give her one more chance. Service: The chef's tables featured KISS bassist/co-lead singer Gene Simmons in the blue kitchen, and JoJo with her then-fiance Dexter Darden, who attended Season 15's second dinner service, in the red kitchen. Nicole, Tara, Brett, and Vlad served the challenge-winning chicken wings tableside. The twenties team completed service despite Ileana and Alyssa's near constant arguing and Alejandro falling behind on garnish. Zeus stalled the forties team with salty and scrambled carbonara, while Charlene and Billy struggled to give times on chicken and Wellington for the chef's table. When they undercooked all the proteins, Ramsay kicked the entire team out. Elimination and Zeus's Exit: Abe nominated Billy and Charlene, but as Ramsay was about to announce his decision, Zeus raised his hand saying he wanted to exit the competition, as he felt overwhelmed and openly admitted he did not want to continue as seriously as Billy and Charlene did. Ramsay first sent Billy back in line and eliminated Charlene for lacking focus and ability, then eliminated Zeus for admitting he was not passionate about the opportunity. Afterwards, he reminded the remaining chefs that the competition was not going to get any easier before dismissing them for the night. Ramsay's comment: "Charlene had trouble with her chicken, and Zeus was nothing but a chicken. Good riddance."
| 317 | 3 | "Clawing Your Way to the Top" | October 13, 2022 | HK-2103 | 1.98 |
Team challenge: Ramsay welcomed Tony Hawk and Sky Brown for a skateboarding demonstration, only to then reveal that the teams' next challenge would be based on consistencies and attention to detail. Both teams had to break down parts of the lobster and present the meat on the plate, with each team scoring one point for each lobster that met Ramsay's standards. The twenties team chose Alyssa and Ileana to sit out due to having two extra members, ultimately winning six-five, with only Sommer failing to score. Reward/punishment: The twenties team got to drive European race cars, while the forties team had to make seafood stock and separate rice by hand for the risotto. Service: Tony Hawk and Nigel Ng (under his persona as "Uncle Roger") attended this service. Alyssa and Sakari served lobster Caesar salad tableside. In the red kitchen, Ileana again clashed with her partner on fish, this time Sommer, who forgot to drop a lobster and brought it up raw. Despite this, the twenties team completed service. However, the forties team struggled again as Billy called out orders over Ramsay and O'Shay gave inaccurate times to Nicole, who undercooked the chicken, while he overcooked the Wellington. When O'Shay and Nicole undercooked the lamb and the New York strip for a different table, Ramsay kicked the forties out. Elimination: Tara nominated O'Shay and Nicole; Ramsay eliminated O'Shay for lacking fightback. Ramsay's comment: "Some evictions are harder than others. This was an easy one. Goodbye, O'Shay." Team change: Later that night, following O'Shay's elimination, Ramsay summoned both teams to announce that going forward, the teams will be separated by gender.
| 318 | 4 | "Slipping Down to Hell" | October 20, 2022 | HK-2104 | 1.93 |
Team challenge: The teams were taken to a water park outside Hell's Kitchen. They were tasked with sliding into a water pool and collecting balls with various ingredients printed on them. They then assigned those ingredients to four different sliders: beef, chicken, lamb and salmon. The women completed the first part of the challenge three seconds faster than the men, and received 35 minutes to cook their dishes compared to the men's 30. Each team selected one slider of each type to present to Ramsay and guest chef David Myers, who scored them on a scale of one-three. Alyssa outscored Alejandro six-four on chicken. Abe outscored Dafne on salmon, five-four. Tara and Vlad both scored two points on lamb. Brett then outscored Nicole five-two on beef, and the men won their first challenge, 16-14. Ramsay and Myers preferred Sommer's beef sliders over Nicole's. Reward/punishment: The men received a trip to sunny Palm Springs, while the women had to wash, slice and peel potatoes for the slider. Service: The menu featured Ramsay's signature chicken slider. Each team received a VIP guest at the chef's table with Corbin Bleu in the red kitchen and Sebastian Bach in the blue kitchen. On appetizers, Brett undercooked an order of sliders, but quickly rebounded. He was later criticized for trying to take control of the meat station from Alex, while Vlad was harshly criticized for not responding to Ramsay's request for a time, but the blue team successfully completed service. The red team breezed through appetizers, but struggled on entrées, getting marched into the storeroom after Alyssa and Sommer served raw lamb. Dafne repeatedly burned salmon, causing the team to run out and forcing the men to help them finish their service. Disappointed with their performance, Ramsay asked the women for three nominees instead of two. Elimination: Ileana nominated Alyssa, Mindy, and Nicole; Ramsay eliminated Nicole for being nominated twice in a row and failing to step up as a leader. This marks the first time in Hell's Kitchen history that four members of an original team (The "40-Somethings") were the first four contestants sent home. Ramsay's comment: "With her team struggling, Nicole decided to hide instead of help. That's all I needed to see."
| 319 | 5 | "Breakfast 911" | October 27, 2022 | HK-2105 | 2.12 |
Team challenge: The teams were awaken early the next morning by first responders and EMTs, whom they were asked to cook breakfast for. The women narrowly finished first, winning their first challenge. Reward/punishment: The women traveled to Hollywood Hills, where they relaxed at a mansion and ate a lunch prepared by Roy Choi. The men had to go through the dumpsters outside Hell's Kitchen and sort out the trash. Service: Actor Cameron Esposito and comedian Loni Love attended service, along with a bachelorette party. In the blue kitchen, Abe served an undercooked carbonara, but he rebounded. On entrées, miscommunication between Billy and Vlad resulted in the team forgetting a beef wellington on order. Vlad then overcooked a lamb chop before delivering an acceptable serving. In the red kitchen, Cheyenne forgot an order of salmon, but she recovered from her mistake. Both teams completed service; The women narrowly won, and the men had to select three nominees for elimination. Elimination: Sakari nominated Alejandro, Billy and Vlad. Ramsay sent Alejandro back in line before sparing Billy and Vlad, deeming the men's performance to be as strong as their previous one. Ramsay's comment: "Tonight, each chef who stumbled bounced back, so I'm giving them a second chance. Tomorrow, they might not be so lucky."
| 320 | 6 | "Til Chef Do Us Part" | November 10, 2022 | HK-2106 | 1.94 |
Team challenge: After showing photos of the chefs and their spouses, Ramsay announced that he would be hosting the previous season's winner, Trenton Garvey, and his fiancée Macee's wedding. The teams were given 45 minutes to prepare a six-course menu consisting of a flatbread appetizer, scallops, shrimp and pasta, a meat entrée, fish entrée, and Southern fried chicken dish. The blue team won the challenge four-two. Reward/punishment: The men went to Road Rage in Los Angeles and ate lunch at Suzanne Goin's restaurant, Cara Cara. The women had to bake a six-layer Bailey's Irish cream cake for the wedding. Service: Several Hell's Kitchen alumni were in attendance for the service, including season 19 winner Kori Sutton, runner-up Mary Lou Davis and fellow Black Jacket recipient Cody Candelario, as well as season 20 chefs Victoria Sonora and Emily Hersh. In the blue kitchen, Billy and Abe struggled to make the former's scallop dish. They first served cold scallops followed by ones that were over-caramelized. Billy took over control of the fish station, only to then serve raw and blackened scallops, forcing Ramsay to ask Cheyenne to help Billy. The blue team's struggles continued on entrées; Alejandro served a cold hangar steak and Brett served raw chicken, causing Ramsay to kick the men out. The women performed well on appetizers, but fell apart on entrées; Alyssa cooked too much garnish for an order of chicken and forgot the garnish for another order. Mindy and Sommer then served cold steaks and raw chicken respectively for the head table. An overcooked steak from Mindy led Ramsay to kick the women out. Sous-chefs Christina and Jason had to serve the head table, so both teams lost. Double elimination: For the women, Cheyenne nominated Alyssa and Sommer and for the men, Alejandro nominated Abe and Billy. Ramsay eliminated Billy for not backing up all his talk, then eliminated Alyssa for sinking her team and failing to bounce back. Ramsay's comment: "It's so sad that on Trenton and Macee's wedding day, I had to say 'I don't' to both Billy and Alyssa."
| 321 | 7 | "Wok This Way" | November 17, 2022 | HK-2107 | 2.07 |
Team challenge: The teams faced the adaptability challenge. They were given 45 minutes and five domes of ingredients. Every few minutes, the chefs had to race to the dome to grab a new ingredient, which they would have to incorporate in their dish. In addition, they had to cook their dish using only a wok. Ramsay was joined by guest judge Stephanie Izard. Alex scored over Dafne on chicken. Sommer scored over Abe on flat-iron steak. Cheyenne scored over Brett on pork tenderloin. Neither Ileana nor Sakari earned a point for their lobster dishes. Both Vlad and Tara scored on shrimp. Mindy then beat Alejandro on snapper, and the women won four-two. Mindy's dish was considered the dish of the day. Reward/punishment: The women enjoyed a rooftop dance party and received a brand-new set of HexClad pots and pans. The men peeled hundreds of beets for the evening's beetroot risotto. Alejandro used his punishment pass to trade places with Sommer. Service: Comedians Andy Richter and Matt Walsh were in attendance in addition to Jim Tavaré and skateboarder Charles "Bucky" Lasek. In the blue kitchen, Vlad was slow to give Ramsay a time on his scallops and Abe served cold mushrooms. In the red kitchen, Mindy served an extra portion of carbonara, while Tara forgot a portion of scallops. Ileana and Cheyenne served raw lamb and overcooked and undercooked beef wellingtons. Sakari sliced his lamb too early and then served it raw, forcing Brett to help him. Both teams successfully finished service, but nonetheless, Ramsay asked them for two nominees each. Elimination: Sommer nominated Ileana and Mindy while the men nominated Abe and Sakari. Ramsay eliminated Mindy, but praised her for her determination. Ramsay's comment: "Mindy had the guts to get her this far, but I have to go with my gut and cut her loose."
| 322 | 8 | "Game On!" | December 1, 2022 | HK-2108 | 2.07 |
Team challenge: The teams participated in two game shows: Spell's Kitchen and Kitchen Sightmares, where they would either have to unscramble or identify various ingredients from a picture. They would then assign those ingredients to three exotic proteins: boar, duck and venison. Ramsay and guest chefs Jon Shook and Vinny Dotolo judged one dish of each protein from each team. Sakari scored on boar, but Sommer and Cheyenne scored on duck and venison, winning the challenge two-one for the women. Reward/punishment: The women went to an exclusive bowling alley. The men prepared gallons of pesto and olives for a special tapenade. Alex used his punishment pass and chose Tara to take his place in the punishment. Cook for your life: The chefs who sat out of the team challenge, Alejandro, Alex, Ileana, Tara, and Vlad, had to compete in the Cook For Your Life challenge, where they had 40 minutes to prepare a chicken dish of their choice. Elimination: Alejandro, Tara, Alex, and Vlad were declared safe. Despite cooking her chicken perfectly, Ileana was eliminated for putting honey in her eggplant puree, which made it overly sweet and threw off the balance of her dish, but gave her encouragement. Ramsay's comment: "When you're cooking for your life, every detail matters. One overly sweet puree got Ileana sent away."
| 323 | 9 | "Putting the Carne in Carnival" | December 8, 2022 | HK-2109 | 1.85 |
Team change: Ramsay moved Brett back to the red team to even up the numbers. Team challenge: The teams played a series of carnival games; the winner of each game received a five-minute head-start in the second part of the challenge, where they were tasked with cooking one of five types of steak: filet mignon, hangar, New York strip, ribcap and ribeye. The red team won three-two after Alex forgot his beurre blanc. Reward/punishment: The red team stayed at the Presidential Suite at the Paradise Point resort in San Diego. The blue team cleaned the dorms and took in deliveries of vegetables for Steak Night. Service: In the blue kitchen, Alex served cold crab cakes, but he recovered. On entrées, both teams served raw salmon and filets. The blue team was later marched into the storeroom after sending overcooked meat and fish. Despite completing service with no ejections, both teams were named losers and asked to come up with two nominees. Elimination: The blue team nominated Alejandro and Vlad, and the red team nominated Brett and Tara. Ramsay sent Tara back in line and eliminated Vlad for struggling on meat as well as confusing a cake tester with a meat thermometer when he was testing the meat. Ramsay's comment: "It's called cake tester for a reason. It tests cakes, not steaks. Vlad, that was bad."
| 324 | 10 | "Everyone's Taco'ing About It" | January 5, 2023 | HK-2110 | 2.22 |
Team challenge: The chefs were challenged to make elevated versions of tacos in 40 minutes, which were to be judged by Ramsay and Danny Trejo who previously attended the final dinner service of Season 16. Each contestant did remarkably well during the challenge, with the biggest criticism being Alejandro's Thai-inspired pork taco being too sweet due to his use of coconut milk without a different flavor profile to balance it out. The blue team initially pulled ahead 3-1, but Cheyenne and Dafne brought the red team back to a 3-3 tie. The tiebreaker went to Dafne (who had the best taco on the red team) over Abe (who had the best taco on the blue team). Reward/punishment: The red team got to spend the day zorbing, followed by being treated to gourmet tacos made by Trejo. The blue team's punishment consisted of shucking crates of corn, which were delivered throughout the day to Hell's Kitchen. Service: Maitre d' Marino returned after taking a few weeks off to visit family in Italy. Cheryl Hines and Rachael Harris, who both attended Season 18's third service, once again dined at the blue chef's table. Dinner service went exceptionally well for both teams throughout the night. Appetizers went out very smoothly, with nothing needing to be refired by either kitchen, although Brett needed Sommer's help to send acceptable scallops and lobster while Alejandro was slow to provide a time on risotto. On entrées, Cheyenne burned her hand trying to put out a fire in an excessively hot pan and Abe fell behind on two salmon after not hearing Alex call for them. As the service continued smoothly, Ramsay gathered both teams to the pass and told them they each had three tickets left to serve, and whoever finished first won the service. On the last ticket, Brett undercooked halibut and Sakari undercooked New York strip. Brett was able to refire his fish up to standards faster, allowing the red team to complete service first for the win. Elimination: The blue team nominated Abe and Sakari for elimination. After hearing both of their pleas, Ramsay first called Brett up to return him to the blue team, feeling he performed better there. He ultimately eliminated Abe for inconsistent service performances but praised his determination. Ramsay's comment: "Abe's performance tonight was more like a C−. With only the best chefs left in the competition, his grades just don't make the cut."
| 325 | 11 | "21st Annual Blind Taste Test" | January 12, 2023 | HK-2111 | 2.08 |
Team Challenge: The teams faced the annual Blind Taste Test. Chefs who failed to correctly identify two ingredients would cause one of their teammates to get hit with alfredo sauce. Further incorrect guesses caused dumps of marinara sauce and Parmesan cheese. Dafne scored two points, and Sakari scored none. Tara scored one, while Alex also failed to score any, giving the red team a three-zero lead. Brett scored one and Sommer scored zero. In the last round, despite Alejandro scoring three points, Cheyenne managed to score two, and the red team won five-four. Reward/punishment: The red team went horseback riding in Hollywood Hills and enjoyed a gourmet Italian meal, while the blue team baked hundreds of macarons. Service: Hell's Kitchen was closed for a private charity service. The blue team cooked for World Series champion Justin Turner and his foundation, The Justin turner Foundation, and the red team cooked for Project Angel Food. Eric McCormack, who attended Season 5's eighth service as the blue team's VIP guest diner was among the contributors to the latter charity. Sakari and Dafne got the scrambled eggs and caviar course out with no issues. On the seared scallops course, Cheyenne was slow to drop the scallops, while Brett was uncommunicative with his team and only put out 11 plates instead of 12. Both teams ran into trouble on the fava bean and pea risotto. Alejandro delivered a risotto that was too salty, while Tara failed to notice that the tempura lobster was clumped together. Alex and Sommer had no issues with the truffle filet course. Ramsay named Sakari and Sommer the best of their respective teams, asking them to select two nominees each for elimination. Elimination: Sakari nominated Alejandro and Brett, and Sommer nominated Dafne and Tara. Ramsay eliminated Brett, feeling that he was not ready to be a leader. Ramsay's comment: "Attention to detail is vital in a fine dining kitchen. When Brett couldn't even count 12 plates correctly, I knew I couldn't count on him."
| 326 | 12 | "What in Hell's Kitchen?" | January 19, 2023 | HK-2112 | 2.16 |
After decorating the Hell's Kitchen exterior and rolling out the purple carpet for the presumed arrival of the Hell's Kitchen Honors, the chefs instead were greeted by a group of skydivers known as the HK Flyers who each reveal a letter on their back that spell the words related to the next challenge, "Black Jackets". Five chefs would receive a black jacket at the end of the day, with the other two going home. Black Jacket Challenge 1: The chefs had 45 minutes to cook a dish dedicated to a loved one or mentor. Sommer and Dafne received the first two black jackets and passes to the Black Jacket Lounge. Black Jacket Challenge 2: The five remaining chefs were tasked to recreate a dish of their choice from Ramsay's menu. Alejandro's lobster ravioli earns him the next black jacket, followed by Alex's fennel salad with carrot puree. Black Jacket 3: In order to earn the final black jacket, Cheyenne, Sakari, and Tara had to create their best pork chop dish. After they finished cooking, Ramsay called down the other four chefs one by one into the dining room to sample the three dishes blindly and pick their favorite. Sommer voted for Sakari's (despite the pork being undercooked), Alex voted for Tara's, and Dafne and Alejandro voted for Cheyenne's dish, eliminating Sakari and Tara. Ramsay did not comment on Sakari or Tara's eliminations.
| 327 | 13 | "The Fab Five Take Flight" | January 26, 2023 | HK-2113 | 2.27 |
In the recap, Sakari and Tara's jackets were hung up and their pictures burned. Individual Challenge: The final five picked Allegiant Airlines flight numbers that each brought a bag containing ingredients inspired by U.S. cities with which they would prepare a dish. Ramsay brought in guest judge Michael Cimarusti, and they reviewed the dishes king of the hill style. Alex's San Francisco crab salad beat Alejandro's Austin barbecue steak, but Sommer's Key West mahi mahi and Cheyenne's New Orleans jambalaya both got a turn on the hill. Cheyenne then defeated Dafne's Boston corn chowder with beer battered cod to win the challenge. Reward/punishment: Cheyenne got to go on an off-roading excursion and took Sommer with her. Alejandro, Alex, and Dafne prepped the kitchens, grounded peppercorns, and shelled pistachios. Service: Tia Mowry was in attendance. Cheyenne got the black jacket team off to a slow start on appetizers, sending up raw lobster and forgetting two orders of scallops. The mistakes continue on entrées as Dafne spoiled Cheyenne and Alex's perfectly cooked proteins with cold mushrooms. Cheyenne began to fall apart after a fire erupts on her station, undercooking salmon, and needing Alex's help. Ramsay is forced to kick the entire team out after Alex undercooked steak, Cheyenne served unevenly cooked salmon, and Dafne forgot the garnish on the same ticket. Elimination: Cheyenne and Dafne were nominated. Ramsay eliminated Cheyenne for lacking experience and being the weakest performer of the night, but praised her for having advanced as far as she did. Ramsay's comment: "As the youngest chef in this competition, Cheyenne came a long way. Unfortunately for her, the ride ends a few stops short of Atlantic City."
| 328 | 14 | "Lights, Camera, Sabotage!" | February 2, 2023 | HK-2114 | 2.05 |
Individual Challenge: Ramsay tasked the final four to produce a visually stunning seafood dish worthy of being featured in Entertainment Weekly, with the magazine's senior editor, Gerrad Hall, as a guest judge. Hall gave glowing reviews to all four dishes, ultimately picking Dafne's sea urchin polenta as his favorite. Reward/punishment: Dafne received a $5,000 shopping spree and lunch for two, which she chose to share with Alex. Alejandro and Sommer churned butter by hand for the upcoming dinner service. Service: Before service, Ramsay gave each chef an opportunity to curse him out. Guests in attendance included Marlee Matlin and Bryce Hall. The final four each got a turn to run the pass, having to spot sabotages by Ramsay, Marino, and the sous-chefs. Alejandro was an effective leader and caught a risotto with orzo pasta and a ribeye in place of a New York strip; however, he failed to notice Christina putting the wrong lentils on a dish. Sommer led rather frantically, failing to notice a ticket missing an appetizer and an entrée and arugula instead of spinach, while also getting bogged down by Alex being slow on risotto. Alex also led confidently and decisively, catching a carbonara with fava beans instead of peas and halibut instead of scallops, but missing venison in place of lamb. Dafne was quiet at times, leading to Sommer talking over her, and she missed a ticket with the wrong number of entrées, before spotting arctic char where there should have been salmon. With everyone having run the pass, they completed service without further incident. Elimination: Ramsay asked the final four to nominate the one person whom they felt did not deserve to continue, and also state their case to advance to the final. After hearing from everyone, he named Alejandro and Alex as the first two finalists for their consistency and strong leadership skills, before picking Dafne as the third finalist and eliminating Sommer for lacking assertiveness and composure at the pass. Ramsay praised Sommer for the growth she had shown throughout the competition, and let her keep her black jacket. Ramsay's comment: "There's no doubt in my mind that Sommer is going to do great things in this industry. She's definitely VIP in my book."
| 329 | 15 | "A Finale for the Ages, Part 1" | February 9, 2023 | HK-2115 | 2.29 |
Alejandro, Alex, and Dafne returned to the dorms where they received a champagne toast. Shortly afterwards, Ramsay called them to the dining room to introduce their final challenge: design their own menu for Hell's Kitchen, each with the help of a sous-chef. Alex got Jason, Dafne got Christina, and Alejandro got season 11 third place finisher Jon Scallion. The final three were treated the next day to a sound therapy session, followed by lunch with Ramsay at Castaway. Afterwards they were greeted by a studio audience, the setting for their menu challenge. Individual challenge: Alejandro, Alex, and Dafne had an hour to prepare their menus consisting of a cold and hot appetizer, and a chicken, fish, and beef entreé. Ramsay brought in a guest judge for each course who would rate each dish on a scale from 1 to 10. Alex scored a 10 on the cold appetizer and Dafne did the same on the hot appetizer, but everyone scored a 10 on fish, giving Dafne a 38-36-36 lead going into the final round. Her 8 on the beef entreé, judged by Curtis Stone, was enough to earn a spot in the final two. Alex then beat Alejandro 10-9 to become the second finalist as Alejandro's wagyu filet was slightly overcooked. Alex received the first choice among the top 10 chefs to draft a brigade for the final dinner service, thanks to scoring three 10s to Dafne's two. He picked Alejandro, Brett, Cheyenne, and Tara. Dafne picked Sommer, Sakari, Vlad, and was left with Abe.
| 330 | 16 | "A Finale for the Ages, Part 2" | February 9, 2023 | HK-2116 | 2.29 |
As Alex and Dafne prepared their teams, Ramsay summoned them individually into his office to spend time with their families. Afterwards, Dafne got stressed out about her ravioli splitting and Alex's team had not prepared the seafood salad. However, Ramsay only had minor criticisms for each of them after sampling their menu. He gave Alex and Dafne their head chef's jackets and thereby commenced the final dinner service. Service: Both teams overcame minor stumbles on appetizers as Dafne struggled to get Sommer and Abe to work together, and Brett undercooked shrimp fritters. Moving onto entrees, Sakari undercooked New York strip twice for Dafne. Brett undercooked chicken for Alex and the refire was slowed down by Cheyenne's undercooked strip. After a warning from Ramsay, Alex and Dafne got their brigades to bounce back and complete service without further issues. Ramsay called Alex and Dafne into his office for the last time, offering praise for their accomplishments throughout the season, and asked them to stand in front of two doors. Alex's door opened, making him the 21st winner of Hell's Kitchen. Alex thanked his wife and kids in a victory speech and Dafne took her defeat graciously. Ramsay's comment: "From the start, Alex emerged as a leader. Not only amongst the 40-year-olds, but also the 20-year-olds. His cooking and his passion pushed him to the front of the pack, making him the ideal choice to be my next head chef."
