= Hell's Kitchen (American TV series) season 19 =

Season of television series

Hell's Kitchen: Las Vegas
- Season 19
- Promotional poster for season 19, featuring host Ramsay
- Hosted by: Gordon Ramsay
- No. of contestants: 18
- Winner: Kori Sutton
- Runner-up: Mary Lou Davis
- No. of episodes: 16

Release
- Original network: Fox
- Original release: January 7 – April 22, 2021

Season chronology
- ← Previous; Rookies vs. Veterans Next → Young Guns

The nineteenth season of the American competitive reality television series Hell's Kitchen (subtitled as Hell's Kitchen: Las Vegas) premiered on Fox on January 7, 2021, and concluded on April 22, 2021. Gordon Ramsay returned as host and head chef, while season seven runner-up Jason Santos returned as the Blue Team's sous-chef, replacing James "Jocky" Petrie, and Christina Wilson returned as the Red Team's sous-chef. Marino Monferrato returned as maître d'. This is the first season to be shot in Nevada.

The season was won by executive chef Kori Sutton, with chef de cuisine Mary Lou Davis finishing second.

Prior to the United States premiere, the season began airing in the United Kingdom in October 2020 on ITV2.

== Production ==
On February 26, 2019, it was announced that the series had been renewed for a nineteenth and twentieth season. Both seasons were filmed in 2019 (prior to the COVID-19 pandemic), with this season being filmed in May 2019 on a set at Caesars Palace on Caesars Entertainment property in Las Vegas, Nevada, replicating the nearby Hell's Kitchen restaurant.

On November 10, 2020, it was announced that the nineteenth season would premiere on January 7, 2021.

== Chefs ==
Eighteen chefs competed in season 19.

Contestant	Age (Note: Age at the time of filming)	Occupation	Hometown	Result
Kori Sutton	37	Executive chef	Los Angeles, California	Winner
Mary Lou Davis	28	Chef de cuisine	San Antonio, Texas	Runner-up
Declan Horgan	42	Executive chef	Washington, D.C.	Eliminated during finals
Cody Candelario	26	Executive sous-chef	Sherman Oaks, California	Eliminated before finals
Amber Lancaster	30	Executive chef	Chicago, Illinois	Eliminated after tenth service
Nicole "Nikki" Hanna	25	Line cook	Wolfeboro, New Hampshire	Eliminated after Black Jackets challenge
Jordan Savell	29	Executive chef	North Richland Hills, Texas	Eliminated after ninth service
Marc Quinones	37	Executive chef	Albuquerque, New Mexico	Eliminated after eighth service
Adam Pawlak	28	Executive chef	Milwaukee, Wisconsin	Eliminated after seventh service
Lauren Lawless	30	Private chef	San Diego, California	Eliminated after "Cook for your life" challenge
Syann Williams	26	Line cook	Atlanta, Georgia	Eliminated after sixth service
Josh Oakley	28	Executive chef	Denver, Colorado	Eliminated after fifth service
Peter Martinez	38	Sous-chef	Palisades Park, New Jersey	Ejected during fourth service
Brittani Ratcliff	30	Executive sous-chef	Morehead, Kentucky	Eliminated after third service
Drew Tingley	30	Line cook	Millmont, Pennsylvania	Hospitalized before wedding breakfast service
Fabiola Fuentes	32	Line cook	Indio, California	Eliminated after second service
Eliott Sanchez	23	Private chef	Bayonne, New Jersey	Eliminated after first service
Kenneth McDuffie	35	Private chef	Philadelphia, Pennsylvania	Eliminated during shrimp challenge

== Contestant progress ==
No.	Chef	Original teams			Switched teams									Individuals			Finals
No.	Chef	1901/1902		1903	1904	1905	1906	1907	1908	1909	1910	1911	1912	1913	1914	1915	1916
1	Kori	IN	WIN	LOSE	LOSE	WIN	WIN	NOM	IN	WIN	WIN	LOSE	IN	IN	IN	IN	WINNER
2	Mary Lou	IN	WIN	LOSE	LOSE	WIN	WIN	LOSE	IN	WIN	WIN	LOSE	IN	IN	IN	IN	RUNNER-UP
3	Declan	IN	LOSE	WIN	LOSE	WIN	LOSE	WIN	IN	LOSE	LOSE	LOSE	IN	NOM	IN	OUT (Note: Declan was eliminated by guest judges during a challenge, not by Ramsay himself)	Kori's team
4	Cody	IN	LOSE	WIN	LOSE	WIN	LOSE	WIN	BoB	LOSE	NOM (Note: Cody nominated himself)	LOSE	IN	IN	OUT		Mary Lou's team
5	Amber	IN	WIN	LOSE	LOSE	WIN	NOM	WIN	NOM	LOSE	LOSE	NOM	IN	OUT			Mary Lou's team
6	Nikki	NOM (Note: Chef was nominated as one of the weakest in the "Menu addition" challenge)	WIN	NOM	LOSE	WIN	WIN	LOSE	BoB	WIN	WIN	LOSE	OUT				Mary Lou's team
7	Jordan	NOM	WIN	NOM	LOSE	WIN	WIN	NOM	NOM	WIN	WIN	OUT					Kori's team
8	Marc	IN	LOSE	WIN	NOM	NOM	LOSE	WIN	NOM	NOM	OUT						Kori's team
9	Adam	IN	LOSE	WIN	LOSE	WIN	LOSE	WIN	IN	OUT							Kori's team
10	Lauren	IN	WIN	NOM	LOSE	NOM	WIN	LOSE	OUT								Mary Lou's team
11	Syann	IN	WIN	LOSE	NOM	WIN	WIN	OUT									
12	Josh	IN	LOSE	WIN	LOSE	WIN	OUT										
13	Peter	IN	LOSE	WIN	NOM	EJEC											
14	Brittani	IN	WIN	LOSE	OUT												
15	Drew	IN	NOM	WIN	HOSP												
16	Fabiola	IN	WIN	OUT													
17	Eliott	NOM	OUT														
18	Kenneth	OUT (Note: Kenneth was eliminated in the "Menu addition" challenge)															

Keywords

- WIN = Won the dinner service
- LOSE = Lost the dinner service
- BoB = Best of the Best, usually exempt from nomination
- BoW = Best of the Worst, sometimes exempt from nomination
- IN = not nominated for elimination
- NOM = nominated for elimination
- OUT = eliminated normally
- LEFT = withdrew from competition
- HOSP = eliminated due to hospitalization
- EJEC = eliminated during service

Color key
Chef was eliminated after regular nomination
Chef was eliminated after Ramsay's nomination
Chef was eliminated without nomination
Chef was eliminated from winning team
Chef was eliminated in the Cook For Your Life challenge
Chef was nominated to participate in the Cook For Your Life challenge
Chef was eliminated during service
Chef withdrew from the competition
Chef was the Best of the Best/Worst
Chef was retained after regular nomination
Chef was retained after Ramsay's nomination
Chef's nomination was voided
The winner of Hell's Kitchen
The runner-up of Hell's Kitchen

== Episodes ==
No. overall	No. in season	Title	Original release date	Prod. code	U.S. viewers (millions)
283	1	"Welcome to Vegas"	January 7, 2021	HK-1901	2.78
Eighteen chefs arrived at the Hell's Kitchen restaurant in Las Vegas, where they met chef Ramsay, who revealed that the winner would become head chef at the Hell's Kitchen restaurant in Lake Tahoe. They were then supposed to be flown to Los Angeles via Allegiant only to end up at the Hell's Kitchen studios nearby the restaurant, which would take place in Las Vegas. Team Challenge/Signature Dish: This year, the signature dish challenge was changed to a cook-off between two chefs, one from each team. Both would go head to head with the same ingredients they received from a slot machine containing a protein, vegetable and starch. Ramsay judged each dish on a 1–5 scale. During the challenge, Kenneth finished his dish with 20 minutes to go, only the second chef to do this after JP in season 13. Declan's New York strip received five points while Nikki's New York striploin received four points. Syann's filet mignon received two because of the raw cauliflower on the side, and Cody's filet mignon got three for the great flavor but bad presentation. Next, Kenneth's chicken scored only one point since it was badly burnt despite being finished too early, while Kori's chicken scored four. In the halibut round, Lauren scored three points for having too much pasta, while Drew scored two points because his pasta lacked salt. Mary Lou scored two for her salmon because of the lack of seasoning and raw rice, while Eliott also scored two for removing the salmon's skin. Adam's lamb received four points while Jordan's lamb received three. Peter and Amber both received four points on their rib eyes. On scallops, Fabiola scored three while Josh scored two for his burnt kale. In the last round, Marc's pork loin received five points after Brittani's pork chop only scored two because it was overcooked, giving the men a 28–27 win. Reward/punishment: The men were rewarded with dinner at Gordon Ramsay's Steak House with Ramsay himself joining them. The women were forced to clean the Caesar Palace fountain. Sous-chef Christina berated Fabiola, Jordan and Mary Lou for not maintaining a serious attitude during the punishment. Challenge – part one: The chefs assembled outside the front entrance to see a helicopter hovering. Someone in the helicopter kicked a crate out and the episode ended on a cliffhanger before it hit the ground.
284	2	"Shrimply Spectacular"	January 14, 2021	HK-1902	2.67
Challenge – part two: The smashed crate revealed the key ingredient for the next challenge: shrimp. Ramsay announced that the chefs would have to cook a shrimp dish to be added to the menu for the entire season. There was also a caveat: whoever prepared the worst dish would be immediately eliminated. That chef would the first person in Hell's Kitchen history to be eliminated before the first service for any reason other than injury or illness. The sous-chefs then selected the top three and bottom two from each team. Lauren, Amber and Syann were the women's top three, while Josh, Cody and Declan were the men's top three. Ultimately, Syann's shrimp and grits (for which she had to substitute with polenta when she couldn't find grits in the storeroom), beat out Josh's tiger prawns with fennel, winning the punishment pass, allowing her to skip any punishment and for the reward, and also swap places with a member of the winning team. Elimination: Nikki and Jordan were the women's bottom two, while Eliott and Kenneth were the men's bottom two. Ramsay eliminated Kenneth for leaving a large chunk of raw Parmesan cheese in his dish (he irked the former even further by misidentifying it as potato) and being the worst performer in both challenges. No comment was given on Kenneth's elimination but his burnt picture and hung jacket could be seen next to Jordan's. Service: Opening night featured VIP chef's tables: comedian/actor Wayne Brady and his family in the blue kitchen, and restauranter/TV personality Lisa Vanderpump and her husband Ken Todd in the red kitchen. Actors Antonio Fargas and Erik Kilpatrick sat in the dining room. Despite Nikki breaking down in tears after undercooking the lobster and serving too few scallops and Mary Lou overcooking the steak, the women successfully completed service. The men quickly served the appetizers but Peter overcooked the duck while Eliott was berated for staring into space and not helping his team. After Drew undercooked the lamb, he, Peter and Eliott were thrown out of the kitchen. Cody took over the garnish station and served raw fries, and Ramsay kicked out rest of the men; they did not serve a single entree and were ordered to provide two nominees. Elimination: The men nominated Drew and Eliott while also considering Peter. Each of them was asked if they perform better than the other and Drew gave a direct response in the affirmative, whereas Eliott only responded that they had "skills in different areas", annoying and confusing both Ramsay and his teammates. Ramsay again asked for a simple yes or no, to which he hesitated before replying no. The former immediately eliminated the latter for his lack of confidence and focus, telling him he had just made it an easy decision. Ramsay's comment: "Eliminating a chef this early is usually quite hard. But tonight, I didn't have to eliminate a chef, I had to eliminate Eliott".
285	3	"Hell Caesar!"	January 21, 2021	HK-1903	2.55
Team Challenge: Outside Hell's Kitchen, the teams were presented with a head bust of Caesar Cardini, the creator of the Caesar salad, and a racecourse. They had to recreate Ramsay's classic Caesar salad after receiving a demonstration, then complete two laps around the racecourse in a scooter to deliver it to him. The first team to deliver 10 perfect salads would win the challenge. Since the women had two extra members, Kori and Amber and Lauren and Brittani were split into pairs. They narrowly won, 10–8. Reward/punishment: The women went on a dune buggy experience in the Nevada desert. The men prepared and peeled hundreds of Scotch quail eggs for the tableside appetizer. After the women returned, Fabiola suffered a panic attack and received medical attention, not being able to join her team until moments before service began. Service: Olympic speed skating champion Apolo Ohno and NFL Hall of Fame running back Marshall Faulk were seated at the red and blue chef's tables, respectively. Imagine Dragons singer Dan Reynolds also attended service. Drew was caught with his pants down while Cody served raw scallops followed by extra portions, as well as raw salmon but rebounded, and the men successfully finished service. In the red kitchen, Fabiola undercooked a flatbread and burned another. Jordan and Lauren struggled with their timing on meat forcing Mary Lou to help them. After Lauren undercooked the duck while Jordan mistakenly served a New York strip instead of the beef Wellington on order, Ramsay kicked the women out. Elimination: The women nominated Lauren and Nikki; however, Ramsay disagreeing with the nominations, called up Jordan and Fabiola instead. He sent the former back in line and eliminated the latter for her poor performance on appetizers and also out of concern for her health. Fabiola struggled to stand up outside Hell's Kitchen when giving her exit interview with a medic holding her. Ramsay's comment: "To be my head chef, you need to have passion, leadership and great skills. Fabiola had passion and not much else".
286	4	"Wedding Bells in Hell"	January 28, 2021	HK-1904	2.56
After the elimination ceremony, Drew was not feeling well, complaining he was experiencing bad body cramps and was sent to the hospital after talking with the medic. Team Challenge: The teams witnessed a wedding vow in the dining room. They were tasking with preparing brunch for couples celebrating their weddings. The menu featured an avocado toast appetizer served with mimosas and the entrees included steak and eggs, eggs Benedict and buttermilk waffles. Josh undercooked and overcooked the steaks, while Amber got overwhelmed by the number of eggs on order. Thanks to Declan overcooking the eggs Benedict on the last ticket, the women finished their brunch first and won the challenge. Reward/Punishment: The women received an overnight trip to Lake Tahoe where they rode snowmobiles in the mountains and stayed at the Harrah's Hotel and Casino. The men were forced to bake 600 cupcakes for the wedding couples. Josh overmixed the batter, causing the cupcakes to collapse, while also putting sugar pearls on the wrong colored cupcakes. Drew's Exit: Before service began, Ramsay notified the teams that Drew's health had not improved, so he would not be able to return to Hell's Kitchen. Drew did not receive a coat hanging and picture burning sequence, but his burnt picture could be seen next to Marc's. Team Switch: With the men down two members and in need of a leader, Ramsay reassigned a not particularly keen Amber to the blue team. Amber became the first person in the history of the series to switch teams after a challenge but before the corresponding dinner service. Service: Sous-chef Christina's girlfriend and family dined in the red kitchen while sous-chef Jay's wife and best friends dined in the blue kitchen. Marino's family sat in the dining room. Also attending service were Mötley Crüe guitarist DJ Ashba, Baywatch star Donna D'Errico and DJ Friese. In the blue kitchen, Peter struggled on fish, incorrectly cooking the scallops, while Declan undercooked the New York strip and argued with Marc on garnish. After Peter burned the blue team's last halibut, Ramsay kicked them out. In the red kitchen, Syann undercooked the flatbread twice, needing all her teammates' help, while Brittani overcooked the salmon. Although Nikki helped Brittani with the salmon, Kori's raw New York strip forced Ramsay to kick them out as well. Both teams failed to serve their chef's table, so they both lost. Elimination: The red team nominated Brittani and Syann, while the blue team nominated Marc and Peter. Although he acknowledged her determination, Ramsay eliminated Brittani for her lack of improvement, poor performance on fish and failure to control her station. Ramsay's comment: "Brittani floundered on the fish station and sank her team, which left me with one option: cut bait".
287	5	"Hell Starts Taking Its Toll"	February 4, 2021	HK-1905	2.82
Team Challenge: Outside Hell's Kitchen, the teams were greeted by a mariachi band. They were split into pairs and had to corral animals representing proteins into a pen, then retrieve eggs representing ingredients, which they used to prepare classic Mexican dishes. The women completed this part of the challenge first and received a five-minute head start in the kitchen. Since they had an extra member, Kori and Mary cooked two dishes (enchilada and Chile relleno), while Adam worked alone. Ramsay was joined by fellow MasterChef judge Aarón Sánchez. The challenge ended in a 2–2 tie, and in a close decision, Adam's enchilada beat out Syann and Nikki's taco, giving the blue team the win. Reward/punishment: The blue team was enjoyed a spa day at the Voie, located at the Paris Hotel. The red team was forced to clean the animals in the pen, scoop up the manure and clean up the hay bales. Syann used her punishment pass, choosing to swap places with Cody. Service: Marc had trouble with the risotto and couldn't communicate with Josh on fish. The latter also broke the halibut by picking it up with tongs instead of a fish spatula. In the red kitchen, although Nikki lacked some confidence on the meat station, she produced flawless entrees. Lauren was called out by Ramsay for not proactively helping her team. Automatic elimination: One hour into service, Peter struggled to keep up on garnish, needing Cody's help with the tomatoes, over seasoning lentils and falling behind on the mashed potatoes. The blue team was asked if they had the qualities to win Hell's Kitchen. While most responded affirmatively, Peter openly admitted that he was not qualified to continue any longer. Ramsay eliminated him on the spot, making him the 10th chef to be eliminated during service. He then instructed Amber to take over the garnish station for the rest of service. Peter stated that he felt he was not ready to become an executive chef if these were the steps he had to take, that the cash prize was not worth the mental stress, and that he wanted to go back home to his family. Ramsay praised both teams for their improved communication without Peter and named them joint winners but nonetheless had them each select one nominee. Nomination: The blue team nominated Marc and the red team nominated Lauren. However, since Peter had already been sent home, Ramsay spare them both. Peter did not receive the coat hanging and picture burning sequence and he did not receive a statement for his departure.
288	6	"Metal & Marina"	February 11, 2021	HK-1906	2.50
The chefs celebrated Josh's birthday before getting called to the dining room by Ramsay. Team Challenge: The teams were greeted with a performance from the band Spandex Nation. Certain chefs selected an opponent to cook against, and that opponent randomly picked an open guitar to determine which classic Italian dish they would have to cook. Chefs Jon Shook and Vinny Ditolo were the guest judges, who along with Ramsay would rate each dish 1–3. The Blue team won 33–28. Reward/punishment: The blue team rode in muscle cars with professional drivers and ate an Italian meal at Buca di Beppo. The red team had to make pasta from scratch, prepare tomatoes and make pesto. Minutes before the doors opened, the chefs were introduced to famed magicians Penn & Teller, who were set to host a magic show at the Rio later that evening. Ramsay announced that service would have to be completed in an efficient, timely manner. Service: Restauranteurs Frank Pellegrino Jr. and Robert Earl dined at the chef's tables for Italian night. Amber had troubles on fish, sending up raw lobster and soggy salmon. Josh was also a roadblock on garnish, failing to communicate with his team and serving bland mashed potatoes. In the red kitchen, Jordan preemptively fired the scallops and Mary Lou and Syann undercooked the beef Wellington and lamb, but all recovered. Both teams completed service, and Ramsay named the red team winners in a close decision. Elimination: The blue team nominated Amber and Josh. Ramsay sent the former back in line and eliminated the latter for his poor performance on garnish and lack of voice. Ramsay's comment: "Tonight, when Josh blows out the candles on his birthday cake, he should wish for one thing: a stronger voice".
289	7	"A Pair of Aces"	February 18, 2021	HK-1907	2.74
Team Challenge: The teams faced the protein identification challenge; they were split into pairs and raced to correctly identify the proteins used in three surf and turf dishes. The light would turn blue if one was correct, red if both were incorrect and green if both were correct. The team that correctly guessed their proteins the fastest would win. The red team went first and clocked in at 8:46, but the blue team timed out due to Declan having to go twice and slowing them down by making random guesses. Reward/punishment: The red team went to Flow Rider on the roof of Planet Hollywood Las Vegas. The blue team de-shelled hundreds of pounds of crab by hand and prepared them for crab cakes for service. Service: The blue team had a near-flawless service, the only issue being Adam searing the scallops on only one side. Amber was praised for her performance on meat, despite her uncertainty over the temperature. In the red kitchen, Syann burned the salmon twice, Jordan served the meat before the garnish was ready and miscommunication between Kori on garnish and Nikki and Jordan on meat resulted in Jordan bringing up a New York strip instead of the Wellington on order. After Kori served soggy fries, Jordan and Nikki overcooked the steak and Syann undercooked the salmon, Ramsay kicked out the red team and had the glue team finish their tickets. Elimination: The red team nominated Kori and Syann, but Ramsay sent Kori back in line and called up Jordan. He then sent Jordan back in line and eliminated Syann for her inexperience and poor performance on fish but praised her energy. Ramsay's comment: "Sy's winning personality and determination were enough to take her far. But her lack of experience made me say sayonara".
290	8	"Crapping Out in Hell"	February 25, 2021	HK-1908	2.58
Team Challenge: The teams faced the craps challenge; they took turns rolling a multi-sided die containing letters, then selecting an ingredient beginning with the letter landed on. Cody and Kori each rolled twice for their respective teams. The challenge ended in a tie at 19. Ramsay used the best dish overall as the tiebreaker, giving the win to Cody and the blue team. Reward/punishment: The blue team received high wire lessons with Absinthe and a special lunch at Nobu. The red team prepared beef wellingtons for both the restaurant and Gordon Ramsay Steak, including the mushroom duxelle. Cook For Your Life: For the third consecutive season, Cook for Your Life took the place of a normal dinner service. Since they had the best craps challenge dish from their respective teams, Nikki and Cody nominated two teammates each. Nikki selected Lauren and Jordan while Cody picked Marc and Amber. The four chefs had 45 minutes to cook a dish using the same five ingredients: filet mignon, wild mushrooms, potatoes, parsnips and Brussels sprouts. Elimination: Ramsay sent Amber back to the dorms, followed by Marc and Jordan and eliminated Lauren for undercooking her steak, despite nailing the other elements of her dish but praised her for her strength. Ramsay's comment: "If you can't fit in with the pack, you better be the top dog. But Lauren was bringing up the rear".
291	9	"Blind Taste Test"	March 4, 2021	HK-1909	2.58
Team Challenge: In the dining room, which had been transformed into a retro 1950s-style dining room, the teams sampled milkshakes with various ingredients infused. Ramsay then revealed the actual challenge: the Blind Taste Test. While one chef tasted, one of their teammates sat in a diner booth and would be dumped with vanilla ice cream for two incorrect guesses, chocolate syrup for three and maraschino cherries for four. Declan scored a perfect four, becoming the fifth chef in Hell's Kitchen history, while Nikki failed to score any, resulting in Jordan getting drenched. Kori beat Adam 3–1 (resulting in Declan getting drench) while Amber, Mary Lou, Cody and Jordan each scored two. Since the red team only had four members, they chose Kori to go against Marc. They blue team automatically won 10–8 after Kori missed two of her three ingredients, meaning the red team could no longer catch up. Reward/punishment: The blue team toured the Grand Canyon in a helicopter and stayed overnight at Caesar Palace's private villa. The red team took in deliveries of beef and prepared them for steak night. Service: NFL Hall of Famer Floyd Little and the Los Angeles Rams cheerleaders were in attendance. The red team had a near-flawless service, with Kori putting in a strong performance on meat. In the blue kitchen, however, Marc's bland shrimp scampi held up the appetizers, while Cody forgot a filet on order. Adam also struggled to communicate on garnish and brought up Marc's overcooked eggs. When Ramsay noticed the latter calling the wrong ticket, he kicked the blue team out. Elimination: The blue team nominated Marc and Adam. Although the former had been significantly declining in performance, Ramsay eliminated the latter for failing to communicate on garnish, which he himself stated was designed to be a test of his communication and leadership skills. Ramsay's comment: "Adam started off the competition strong. But unlike his beard, Adam stopped growing".
292	10	"There's Something About Marc"	March 11, 2021	HK-1910	2.44
Team Challenge: The teams were greeted with a demonstration from magician Seth Grabel. Three members collected playing cards from a 52 pickup representing ingredients while one placed them on the board. They had 35 minutes to make five gourmet burgers, one of which would be a team effort. Michelin-starred chef Laurent Tourondel was the guest judge. In the last round, Mary Lou beat Cody on lamb and the red team won 3–2. Reward/punishment: The red team visited Dig This where they crushed cars in a construction site. The blue team prepared 500 pounds of potatoes for a pomme puree. Service: Before service began, Ramsay allowed both teams to pick their stations. He also invited two former winners to dine at the chef's tables. Scott Commings (season 12) dined in the blue kitchen, and Michelle Tribble (season 17) dined in the red. Grabel sat in the dining room as well as a 12-top bachelor party that both kitchens had to work together to serve. The red team had another perfect service, with Nikki in particular being singled out for her dramatic improvement since the start of the competition. Marc got the blue team to a bad start on appetizers by not realizing that his stove was off, which he attempted to blame on Cody. He then undercooked the risotto and overcooked the carbonara, earning a warning in the pantry. On entrees, Declan undercooked the lamb and Amber undercooked the halibut for the chef's table, causing an angry Ramsay to kick out the blue team. Elimination: The blue team nominated Marc and Cody nominated himself, the latter to teach Declan and Amber a lesson in loyalty since both threw each other under the bus during the deliberations (as well as attempt to force Ramsay's hand into eliminating Marc, as he saw him as a serious liability to the welfare of the team). The former immediately eliminated the latter for being on a downward spiral over the past several services and refusing to take responsibility for his mistakes. Ramsay's comment: "Marc is a big talker and a decent cook. But I'm looking for someone who can lead a brigade. Marc couldn't even win over his own team".
293	11	"Sink or Swim"	March 18, 2021	HK-1911	2.74
Team Challenge: The teams played a game of Spells Kitchen. In each round, one chef from each team had to decipher a scrambled ingredient on the screen. The winner had the choice of either keeping the ingredient for themselves or sending it to the other team. Since the red team had an extra member, Nikki and Mary Lou both made a halibut dish; they later dropped the former's. Both teams scored on ribeye and veal chop, but Cody beat Mary Lou on halibut, giving the blue a narrow win, 3–2. Reward/punishment: The blue team received a pool day at the Link and enjoyed all-American barbecue lunch but were forced inside due to rain. The red team was forced to bake 600 tuile cookies. Service: For one night only, Hell's Kitchen hosted a private dinner service for two charities. The red team cooked for the Sarah McLachlan School of Music, whose table included three-time Grammy Award winner Sarah McLachlan. The blue cooked for the Chris Long Foundation, whose table included former NFL Walter Payton Man of the Year winner Chris Long and Tampa Bay Buccaneers player Beau Allen. One chef from each team took charge of a course, though Declan had to lead both the scallop appetizer and the filet entree with the blue team being short a member. On the first course, Ramsay criticized Declan for cooking all the scallops himself and relegating Amber and Cody to plating, while Nikki only put out 10 plates instead of the required 12. Mary Lou and Cody and Kori and Amber led the risotto and halibut courses respectively without problems. However, Amber got overwhelmed by Declan asking her to cook all the filets and burned one portion, while Jordan led passively and did not check the filets before Ramsay pointed out that some of them were raw. Both teams had no issues with the sticky toffee pudding dessert. Ramsay named both losers on the grounds that he had to stop their mistakes from leaving the kitchen and asked each for one nominee. Elimination: The blue team nominated Amber and the red team nominated Jordan. Ramsay sent the former back in line and eliminated the latter for her lack of leadership but praised her for her hard work and energy. Ramsay's comment: "Jordan soldiered through many battles here in Hell's Kitchen. But tonight, she lost the war".
294	12	"There's Magic in Hell?"	March 25, 2021	HK-1912	2.85
Sous-chefs Christina and Jason took the chefs to the back of Planet Hollywood and into an elevator which lead them to the venue's auditorium. Ramsay surprised them with a VIP performance from magician/illusionist Criss Angel who revealed one more surprise at the end when he made four women appear in a spinning box and all were modeling black jackets. Black Jacket Challenge 1: The first challenge was Taste It, Now Make It. The chefs had to recreate one of Ramsay's most complex signature dishes. Mary Lou, Nikki and Declan correctly identified the protein as cod while Kori, Cody and Amber misidentified it as sea bass. Nikki and Declan also correctly identified the white and orange purees as cauliflower and butternut squash respectively, but only Mary Lou recognized both the purees and the two ingredients in the salad: green apple and endive, earning her the first black jacket. Declan received the second black jacket for correctly identifying shallots as part of the garnish. Black Jacket Challenge 2: The remaining chefs randomly selected one of six briefcases each containing different ingredients and 40 minutes to cook. Nikki overcooked her lobster tail forcing her to chop it up and put it in her polenta, but the flavors were solid. Amber's pan-seared black cod with yuzu and miso beurre blanc was impressive, but the fish itself was bland. Kori's pan-seared salmon with roasted cauliflower and spinach pesto and Cody's pork chop with polenta and bourbon pickled corn and pomegranate and chorizo vinaigrette earned them the next two black jackets. Black Jacket Challenge 3: Nikki and Amber had to make a dish that represented their childhood. Nikki cooked an herb panko-baked pork chop with scalloped potatoes and green beans, while Amber made a play on beef bourguignon: a filet with Yukon mashed potatoes and pearl onions. Both cooked their proteins perfectly and Ramsay deemed both dishes phenomenal. Elimination: Ultimately, Amber's dish barely edged out Nikki's and she received the final black jacket. However, Ramsay praised the latter's growth in Hell's Kitchen, telling her she earned his respect. He also offered to fly her to any of his restaurants to study. Nikki was allowed to keep her jacket and received a retrospective montage. She did not receive the coat hanging and portrait burning sequence, but her burnt picture could be seen next to Amber's.
295	13	"It's Time!"	April 1, 2021	HK-1913	2.62
Individual Challenge: The black jackets were greeted in the dining room with an introduction from famed MMA announcer Bruce Buffer, who stood in a boxing ring. They were presented with five domes of ingredients: protein, starch, vegetable and two wild cards. Each time the bell was rung, the chefs had to race to the ring to grab an ingredient from the dome, which they would be required to use in their dish. Michael Cimarusti was the guest judge; the dishes were judged king of the hill. Declan's oven-roasted chicken with Irish champ impressed, beating out Amber's filet with Yukon mash and poblano and truffle cream sauce, but Mary Lou's veal chop with parsnip puree and pickled corn dethroned him and beat out Cody's pan-seared halibut with couscous and Kori's poached lobster with tomatillo salsa and kumquats, winning her the challenge. Reward/punishment: Mary Lou raced in luxury sports cards, then ate lunch at The Palm with sous-chefs Christina and Jason and chose Kori to join her. She also received a set of All-Clad cookware. Amber, Cody and Declan participated in recycling day and prepared the kitchen for service. Service: WWE wrestler Ember Moon and Animal Planet host Wayde King attended service. Declan undercooked the crab cakes but rebounded. Amber sent up scallops that were only cooked on one side, Mary Lou communicated well on garnish and Cody was consistent on meat. However, Amber burned the salmon and got overwhelmed by the salmon and halibut on a different ticket, needing help from Kori, Declan and Mary Lou, much to Ramsay's frustration. Amber undercooked the halibut and Mary Lou didn't catch it, and the former was brought to the pantry to regroup. The team finished service without further problems but Ramsay wasn't satisfied with the performance. Elimination: The black jackets nominated Declan and Amber. Ramsay eliminated Amber for her poor performance on fish, inconsistency and serious downward spiral since switching teams but praised her palate. She received a retrospective montage. Ramsay's comment: "Amber came here expecting to beat the competition, but her biggest obstacle ended up being herself".
296	14	"Snuggling with the Enemy"	April 8, 2021	HK-1914	2.63
Individual Challenge: Shortly before 7:00 a.m., sous-chefs Christina and Jason woke up the chefs and told them to meet Ramsay in his office. They passed through a crowd of clubgoers in the dining room. He told them they would have an hour to cook 40 portions of any comfort food for the guests, who would vote on their favorite. While cooking, Declan got distracted by a pole dancer and Kori burned a pan of sesame seeds. Kori won the challenge, while Cody finished in second place, followed by Declan with 23 percent and Mary Lou with 15 percent. Reward/punishment: Kori went on a $4,000 shopping spree at Macy's and chose Cody to join her. They also each received a set of Hell's Kitchen home and kitchen goods. Declan and Mary Lou had to clean out the dorms. Kori bought a pink suit for Cody, a pan for Declan and a Vitamix blender for Mary Lou, the only remaining chef who had yet to win one in a challenge. Service: The chefs took turns running the pass while looking out for acts of sabotage from the sous-chefs. Cody caught Christina giving him a risotto with orzo instead of rice, as well as a carbonara with pappardelle instead of fettuccine. However, Marino gave him a ticket containing duck, which he didn't realize wasn't on the menu until Kori pointed it out. Cody also noticed Mary Lou's overcooked salmon but hesitated while telling her to refire it. Mary Lou missed a wellington stuffed with tapenade instead of duxelle, but spotted beets instead of carrots when in the wellington garnish. Kori did not respond when Mary Lou called out the ticket and undercooked the lamb. Declan failed to notice endive substituted for fennel but recovered to catch tuna tartare instead of beef and zucchini (courgettes) in the carbonara instead of peas. Kori stopped sous-chef Christina from sending up halibut nuggets instead of scallops and later sea bass instead of halibut. Cody was slowed by the burnt meat Kori left behind, bringing up a raw wellington and falling behind on the refire. Overall, Ramsay was satisfied with the chefs' performance at the pass but not so much on the line and asked them each to name someone they wanted to be with in the finale. Elimination: Kori and Cody said they wanted to cook against Mary Lou, who picked Kori while Declan picked Cody. Ramsay eliminated Cody for his indecisive leadership and struggles on meat but told him he could keep his jacket and reach out to him anytime. The latter received a retrospective montage. He then named Declan as the first finalist before announcing that Kori and Mary Lou would both join him in the finale. The three chefs would have to face one more challenge to determine which two would cook in the final service. This marked only the second three-person finale in Hell's Kitchen history after season 17. Ramsay's comment: "Throughout this competition, Cody was never shy about his abilities. But when it came to running the pass, he was just a bit shy, so unfortunately, it was time to say goodbye".
297	15	"What Happens in Vegas..."	April 15, 2021	HK-1915	2.84
The final three celebrated in the dorms with champagne before being summoned back to the dining room shortly afterwards, where Ramsay announced the final challenge: they would each need to prepare a menu consisting of a cold and hot appetizer, and seafood, chicken and red meat entree. Each received assistance from a sous chef: Kori got Christina, Mary Lou got Jay, and Declan got Michelle Tribble. The next morning, Ramsay called the finalists one by one to his office to reunite with their families: Kori's father and son, Mary Lou's mother and cousin and Declan's parents, who had to be pulled out of their vacation. The finalists spent time with their loved ones in the black jacket lounge, then toured the city in a limousine. They entered Bally's through an underground entrance and were introduced to a packed theater. Challenge/elimination: They had one hour to cook their final menus, with the help of the sous-chefs. Each course was rated on a 1–10 scale. The guest judges were Michelle Bernstein, Tyson Cole, Susan Feniger, Neal Fraser and Wolfgang Puck. Kori and Mary Lou both scored a perfect 10 on the cold appetizer while Declan scored nine. Mary Lou scored 10 on the hot appetizer as well, but Declan and Kori each only scored eight. On fish, Kori and Mary Lou scored nine each to Declan's eight. Declan scored his first 10 on chicken, while Kori got nine and Mary Lou got eight. In the last round, the red meat course, Kori, Mary Lou and Declan scored nine, eight and seven respectively, leading to a final score of 45–45–42 and eliminating Declan. No statement was given for his elimination. Mary Lou received the first choice of the eight returning chefs from the season to form a brigade for the final service, since she earned more 10s than Kori. The former selected Cody, Nikki, Amber and Lauren, while the latter picked Declan, Jordan, Adam and was left with Marc. The chefs then returned to Hell's Kitchen to prepare for the service, with the episode ending on a cliffhanger.
298	16	"Hitting the Jackpot"	April 22, 2021	HK-1916	2.93
Kori and Mary Lou went through their final menus with their respective brigades. Mary Lou was concerned about Lauren asking too many basic questions and Amber complained to Kori, whom she considered her only friend, about getting passed over in favor of Jordan. Mary Lou cooked in the red kitchen with sous-chef Christina and Kori cooked in the blue kitchen with sous-chef Jason. Ramsay brought the two finalists into his office right before service and handed them their chef's jackets, then introduced them to the diners. Service: Comedian Rita Rudner and the finalists' families attended the final service. On the first ticket Lauren didn't pay attention to Mary Lou calling out an order, and despite cooking grits properly, was slow to provide time for them. Kori was delayed by Adam looking unfocused before serving a shrimp without the head. After that, both teams completed appetizers smoothly. When entrees came around, Nikki did well on the rib eyes, but Amber forgot to cook the chicken, forcing the entire ticket to be started over. She then undercooked the refire, and Ramsay warned Mary Lou that Amber was going to sink her service. The former switched the latter to garnish and had Cody take over meat, after which the entrees could finally be served. Meanwhile, Jordan undercooked the filet twice, so Ramsay suggested that Kori send Declan to help Jordan on meat. Eventually, both teams reached their final ticket simultaneously and completed service with no further issues. After service, Ramsay faked Kori and Mary Lou out by announcing that the winner was going to be a woman for the seventh season in a row, before sending them to the dorms. After offering praise for their respective performances this season, he asked them to stand in front of the two doors and turn the handles. Kori's door opened, making her the 19th winner of Hell's Kitchen and seventh consecutive female winner overall, and the oldest winner in the show's history, beating season 12's Scott Commings. Mary Lou took her defeat graciously. Ramsay's comment: "Kori is everything I could want in a head chef. She is decisive, level-headed, and most importantly, passionate. From the moment she stepped into Hell's Kitchen, she was an instinctual and natural-born leader. She'll be a great asset to Hell's Kitchen in Lake Tahoe".
