= Hell's Kitchen (American TV series) season 20 =

Season of television series

Hell's Kitchen: Young Guns
- Season 20
- Promotional poster for season 20, featuring host Ramsay
- Hosted by: Gordon Ramsay
- No. of contestants: 18
- Winner: Trenton Garvey
- Runner-up: Megan Gill
- No. of episodes: 16

Release
- Original network: Fox
- Original release: May 31 – September 13, 2021

Season chronology
- ← Previous; Las Vegas Next → Battle of the Ages

The twentieth season of the American competitive reality television series Hell's Kitchen (subtitled as Hell's Kitchen: Young Guns) premiered on Fox on May 31, 2021, and concluded on September 13, 2021. Gordon Ramsay returned as host and head chef, while Christina Wilson returned as the Red Team's sous-chef and Jason Santos returned as the Blue Team's sous-chef. Marino Monferrato returned as maître d'. This is the last season to be shot in Nevada before returning to California in season 21.

The season was won by executive chef Trenton Garvey, with line cook Megan Gill finishing second.

== Production ==
On February 26, 2019, it was announced that the series had been renewed for a nineteenth and twentieth season. Both seasons were filmed in 2019 (prior to the COVID-19 pandemic) at a television studio a short distance from the actual Hell's Kitchen restaurant in Las Vegas, Nevada. On April 7, 2021, it was announced that the twentieth season would premiere on May 31, 2021.

== Chefs ==
Eighteen chefs competed in season 20, with all of them aged 24 years old or younger.

Contestant	Age	Occupation	Hometown	Result
Trenton Garvey	23	Executive chef	Union, Missouri	Winner
Megan Gill	23	Line cook	Denton, Texas	Runner up
Kiya Willhelm	22	Head chef	Barrelville, Maryland	Eliminated during finals
Brynn Gibson	21	Line cook	Vienna, Virginia	Eliminated before finals
Steven Glenn	21	Chef de partie	Richmond, Virginia	Eliminated after tenth service
Antonio Ruiz	23	Executive chef	San Antonio, Texas	Eliminated after Black Jackets challenge
Emily Hersh	22	Line cook	New York, New York	Eliminated after Black Jackets challenge
Sam Garman	23	Executive chef	Fleetwood, Pennsylvania	Eliminated after ninth service
Josie Clemens	22	Private chef	Macomb, Michigan	Eliminated after eighth service
Victoria Sonora	21	Jr. sous-chef	Longmont, Colorado	Eliminated after seventh service
Keanu Hogan (Note: Credited as Keona Hogan)	23	Private chef	Baltimore, Maryland	Eliminated after "Cook for your life" challenge
Kevin Argueta	21	Line cook	Los Angeles, California	Ejected during sixth service
Payton Cooper	21	Sous-chef	Lexington, Kentucky	Eliminated after fifth service
Morgana Vesey	21	Sous-chef	New London, Connecticut	Eliminated after fourth service
Alex Lenik	22	Line cook	Chicago, Illinois	Eliminated after third service
Jayaun "Jay" Smith	23	Private chef	Kansas City, Missouri	Eliminated after second service
Matthew Francis Johnson	24	Food vlogger	Duluth, Minnesota	Eliminated after first service
Ava Harren	23	Meal prep chef	Anchorage, Alaska	Eliminated at the end of alcohol challenge

== Contestant progress ==
No.	Chef	Original teams				1st switch		2nd switch						Individuals			Finals
No.	Chef	2001/2002		2003	2004	2005	2006	2007	2008	2009	2010	2011	2012	2013	2014	2015/2016	
1	Trenton	IN	LOSE	LOSE	LOSE	WIN	WIN	WIN	IN	LOSE	WIN	WIN	IN	IN	IN	IN	WINNER
2	Megan	IN	WIN	WIN	LOSE	WIN	WIN	WIN	IN	NOM	BoB	WIN	IN	IN	IN	IN	RUNNER-UP
3	Kiya	IN	WIN	WIN	LOSE	LOSE	LOSE	WIN	IN	LOSE	BoB	LOSE	IN	IN	IN	OUT	Trenton's team
4	Brynn	BoB	WIN	WIN	NOM	LOSE	LOSE	WIN	IN	NOM	WIN	LOSE	IN	NOM	OUT		Trenton's team
5	Steve	BoB	LOSE	LOSE	LOSE	WIN	WIN	WIN	IN	LOSE	NOM	WIN	IN	OUT			Megan's team
6	Antonio	NOM (Note: Chef was nominated by the BoB (Best of the Best) as one of the weakest in the "Alcohol" challenge)	LOSE	LOSE	NOM	WIN	WIN	WIN	IN	LOSE	WIN	NOM	OUT				Trenton's team
7	Emily	NOM	WIN	WIN	LOSE	WIN	WIN	WIN	NOM	LOSE	WIN	WIN	OUT				Megan's team
8	Sam	IN	LOSE	LOSE	LOSE	LOSE	NOM	WIN	NOM	LOSE	WIN	OUT					Trenton's team
9	Josie	IN	WIN	WIN	NOM	LOSE	NOM	WIN	NOM	NOM	OUT						Megan's team
10	Victoria	IN	WIN	WIN	NOM	WIN	WIN	WIN	NOM	OUT							Megan's team
11	Keanu	NOM	WIN	WIN	LOSE	NOM	LOSE	WIN	OUT								
12	Kevin	IN	LOSE	LOSE	LOSE	WIN	WIN	EJEC									
13	Payton	IN	NOM	LOSE	LOSE	NOM	OUT										
14	Morgana	IN	WIN	WIN	LOSE	OUT											
15	Alex	NOM	LOSE	NOM	OUT												
16	Jay	IN	NOM	OUT													
17	Matthew	NOM	OUT														
18	Ava	OUT (Note: Ava was eliminated in the "Alcohol" challenge)															

Keywords

- WIN = Won the dinner service
- LOSE = Lost the dinner service
- IN = not nominated for elimination
- NOM = nominated for elimination
- OUT = eliminated normally
- LEFT = withdrew from competition
- HOSP = eliminated due to hospitalization
- EJEC = eliminated during service

Color key
Chef was eliminated after regular nomination
Chef was eliminated after Ramsay's nomination
Chef was eliminated without nomination
Chef was eliminated from winning team
Chef was eliminated in the Cook For Your Life challenge
Chef was nominated to participate in the Cook For Your Life challenge
Chef was eliminated during service
Chef withdrew from the competition
Chef was the Best of the Best/Worst
Chef was retained after regular nomination
Chef was retained after Ramsay's nomination
Chef's nomination was voided
The winner of Hell's Kitchen
The runner-up of Hell's Kitchen

== Episodes ==
No. overall	No. in season	Title	Original release date	Prod. code	U.S. viewers (millions)
299	1	"Young Guns: Young Guns Come Out Shooting"	May 31, 2021	HK-2001	2.32
Eighteen chefs arrived in Las Vegas and were led on a tour of the Hell's Kitchen museum. At the end, a curtain parted to reveal an audience. Ramsay introduced the "Young Gun" chefs and revealed that the winner of the season would become the head chef at Gordon Ramsay Steak at the Paris Las Vegas hotel. Team challenge/signature dish: The chefs were given 45 minutes to cook their signature dishes, to be rated on a scale of one to five. The women won 30–28 Reward/punishment: The women ate lunch at the prize restaurant, while the men prepared stock for both kitchens. Before service, the chef learned the menu from the sous-chefs. Challenge – part one: Ramsay then introduced the first individual challenge, where the chefs would have to make a creative dish using alcohol. The winner would receive a punishment pass, allowing them to skip a punishment and join the reward while swapping places with a member of the other team. However, he also said that one chef would be eliminated shortly, ending the episode on a cliffhanger.
300	2	"Young Guns: Temping the Meat"	June 7, 2021	HK-2002	2.55
Challenge – part two: The chefs were given 45 minutes to cook a dish using one of the proteins provided and any type of alcohol. They were then instructed to taste all the dishes from their respective teams and decide on the top three. Antonio campaigning for his own dish along with the men's choice of Matthew both backfired which led to Ramsay automatically naming Steve's as the best. The women selected Victoria, Megan and Brynn, and Brynn's dish was judged to have the edge. In a surprise decision, Ramsay awarded both Brynn and Steve punishment passes. He then tasked them with nominating the bottom three. Elimination: Brynn nominated Ava, Keanu and Emily while Steve nominated Matthew, Antonio and Alex. Ramsay picked Matthew and Ava as the bottom two; he sent the former back in line and eliminated the latter. Service: NASCAR champion Kurt Busch and boxing legend Mike Tyson dined at the red and blue team's chef's table respectively. In celebration of Hell's Kitchen's 300th dinner service, Alex and Brynn served a special shrimp flambé appetizer. The women had a flawless performance, save for vegetarians Emily and Josie being slightly confused on fish and meat respectively. However, the men completely fell apart due to a lack of communication and cohesiveness. Jay delivered a raw salmon before any appetizers had been served, Matthew undercooked the lamb and Payton forgot the chicken for the chef's table while giving out inconsistent times. Despite being given a wakeup call in the pantry, the men continued to give conflicting times and a fed up Ramsay kicked them out and asked for two nominees. Elimination: The men nominated Matthew and Payton; Ramsay also called up Jay. After Payton and Jay gave their pleas, he eliminated Matthew without hearing one for his bad attitude and consistently terrible performances, even while using a meat thermometer during service. Ramsay's comment: "Matthew may be considered a chef on the Internet, but unfortunately, I had to taste his food, and that's why I had to block him from the competition."
301	3	"Young Guns: Come Hell or High Water!"	June 14, 2021	HK-2003	2.60
Team Challenge: Ramsay brought back the squid preparation challenge from season one but with a twist. Outside Hell's Kitchen, the teams had to climb into a large tank and retrieve the squid then break it down completely following a demonstration. The first team to prepare 16 portions would win. The men lead 14–13 but Victoria, Megan and Emily each got one accepted to give the women their second challenge win. Reward/punishment: The women went to Speed Vegas where they drove off-road trucks in sand dunes and were treated to lunch from BLT Steak. The men prepared a delivery of squid, clams and shrimp and ate raw calamari sandwiches. Service: Maude owner Curtis Stone and Osteria Mozza chef/owner Nancy Silverton dined at the red and blue team's chef's tables. Professional boxer Shane Mosley Jr. and voice actor Bob Bergen sat in the dining room, in addition to a group of mimes. Steve and Morgana served tableside squid ink tagliatelle. The women had another successful service, save for Megan delivering a halibut that wasn't on order following a miscommunication. However, the men failed to improve upon their mistakes from the previous one. Kevin cooked the scallops too early, Jay forgot the wellington garnish and the team had trouble repeating a ticket. Alex undercooked the chicken, earning the men a trip to the pantry; Antonio was also scolded for calling his teammates "baby". Ramsay promptly threw them out after Alex undercooked the refire and demanded two nominees. Elimination: The men nominated Alex and Jay despite Antonio attempting to put himself up. When asked who told him the chicken was cooked, Alex blamed Antonio who in turn blamed Trenton; both were called forward to explain but both denied it, leading to a frustrated Ramsay going to his office for a brief moment before asking the men for the truth regarding chicken-gate. Sam then admitted to pulling the chicken out of the oven and giving it to Alex without checking the inside first. Ramsay sent Antonio, Trenton and Sam back in line and eliminated Jay for his second poor service in a row. Ramsay's comment: "After watching Jay struggle so badly on garnish, I decided to assign him to a different station: the train station."
302	4	"Young Guns: Young Guns Going Big"	June 21, 2021	HK-2004	2.60
Team Challenge: The teams were tasked with cooking brunch for the Paris Las Vegas employees. The menu included a seasonal fruit salad appetizer served with sparking lemonade and the entrées included French omelet, filet mignon and eggs and eggs Benedict. Emily cooked the omelet too early but recovered. Alex gave inconsistent times on the steaks, confusing his team, while Trenton fried the egg in a cast-iron pan, but both quickly recovered. The women narrowly won after Alex and Payton overcooked the steak on the men's last ticket. Reward/punishment: The women toured the Las Vegas Strip, Grand Canyon and Hoover Dam in a private plane and stayed overnight at Planet Hollywood. The men prepared hundreds of pastries for Caesar's-owned buffets. Steve used his punishment pass to join the women and chose to swap places with Brynn. Service: Dinner service opened early for the theater guests. Magician/illusionist Criss Angel and famed magicians Penn & Teller dined at the red and blue team's chef's tables. Kevin and Keanu served seafood chowder tableside. For the first time this season, the red team struggled as Josie burnt the pizza and Brynn called out the wrong ticket while Victoria sent up the salmon too early and then undercooked the refire. In the blue kitchen, Antonio delivered scallops seared on only one side, dragged on the halibut and undercooked the salmon. Meanwhile, Alex was flustered on garnish all night, even requesting a "breather" on the first table of entrées. Although neither team was thrown out, Ramsay was not satisfied with their performances and asked for two nominees from each. Elimination: The men nominated Alex and Antonio while the women nominated Josie and Brynn. Ramsay sent Brynn back in line and replaced her with Victoria but ultimately eliminated Alex for performing poorly on garnish, admitting to being flustered in the kitchen and not backing up his talk. Team change: Ramsay transferred Victoria, Emily and Megan to the blue team, and Payton and Sam to the red team, hoping that both teams could recover. Ramsay's comment: "I was shocked when Alex asked me for a breather on the first ticket of the night. Fortunately for him, he's got plenty of time for that breather now."
303	5	"Young Guns: Stirring the Pot"	June 28, 2021	HK-2005	2.42
Team Challenge: The teams were greeted with a large screen displaying text messages from Ramsay. They were then each given a jacket with a recipe on the back written in emojis. They had to cook the recipe as one of their teammates interpreted it to them. The red team won four to two, as Trenton and Megan added ingredients to the fish and chips and eggplant Parmesan, respectively, that weren't required, and Steve forgot to toss the spaghetti in the sauce. Reward/punishment: The red team rode on the High Roller Ferris wheel and ate lunch at Chayo Mexican. The blue team cleaned the Eiffel Tower at the Paris Las Vegas in maid uniforms. Service: Game show host Miss Behave was in attendance. Kiya and Antonio served shaved asparagus and frisée salad tableside. The blue team won their first dinner service thanks to improved communication and strong performances by Emily and Megan. Despite a strong start by Brynn on appetizers, Payton served the wrong garnish twice and Morgana undercooked the halibut and salmon and struggled with communication. Ramsay kicked out the red team and demanded three nominees rather than two. Elimination: The red team nominated Payton, Morgana and Keanu, but Ramsay did not call Keanu down as he felt she did not have a poor service. He then eliminated Morgana for her poor performance on fish and lack of voice. Ramsay's comment: "Morgana might be baby-faced, but tonight, she behaved like a baby when her fish station struggled. The protégé I'm looking for needs to be confident and outspoken. Morgana was neither."
304	6	"Young Guns: A Ramsay Birthday in Hell!"	July 5, 2021	HK-2006	2.51
Team Challenge: After showing pictures of the chefs in their younger years, Ramsay announced for that night's service, he was hosting his eldest daughter Megan's 21st birthday party. The teams had to prepare a tasting menu, consisting of three appetizers and three entrées. Since the blue team had an extra member, they dropped Victoria's pork slider. Kiya's sticky wings, Brynn's lobster roll and Antonio's lobster macaroni and cheese were selected as appetizers and Trenton's pepper jam chicken lollipops, Megan's soy noodles and Keanu's smoked shrimp and grits were chosen as entrées, resulting in a tie at three. Megan's rice noodles with soy ginger peanut sauce was deemed the best dish and the blue team earned their first challenge win. Reward/punishment: The blue team enjoyed a flow rider experience at Planet Hollywood followed by dinner at Cafe Hollywood. The red team had to set up the dining room for service. Service: The blue team had another strong service, the only issue being Antonio undercooking the carbonara and being slow on the refires. The red team fumbled for the second time in a row. Payton and Sam undercooked the New York strip twice and then Megan Ramsay sent back Payton's bland noodles. The final straw was the whole team except Kiya jumping on the meat station and undercooking the lamb. Ramsay kicked them out of the kitchen and once again demanded three nominees. Elimination: The red team nominated Sam, Payton and Josie. Ramsay eliminated Payton for his inconsistency and the bland noodles. Ramsay's comment: "Payton struggled on the blue team and the Red Team. One thing's for sure, I don't want him on my team."
305	7	"Young Guns: If You Can't Stand the Heat..."	July 12, 2021	HK-2007	2.60
Team Challenge: The chefs received soccer uniforms from the sous-chefs. They were then taken to Cashman Field, home to Las Vegas Lights FC of the USL Championship. Before the challenge began, the blue team was asked for a volunteer to join the red; Emily and Victoria volunteered but Ramsay chose Antonio. The teams kicked soccer balls labeled with ingredients into six nets, each representing an international cuisine. Back in Hell's Kitchen, they had 40 minutes to cook their dishes. Ramsay brought in Michelin starred chef Michael Cimarusti as a guest judge. In the last round, Keanu beat Trenton on Greek and the red team won the challenge four to two. Reward/punishment: The red team was treated to a pool party at the Flamingo Hotel Casino which featured a magic show from Piff the Magic Dragon. The blue team prepared the dining room for service by steaming and ironing the tablecloths and polishing the silverware and glasses. Service: UFC Hall of Famer Forrest Griffin and UFC president Dana White dined at the red and blue team's chef tables. Both teams struggled on appetizers, especially Kevin who undercooked the lobster three times. The red team rebounded on entrées despite Keanu not communicating clearly on garnish. Automatic elimination: After Kevin fell so far behind on the salmon that Steve and Trenton overcooked the lamb, Ramsay ran out of patience, gathered the blue team in the pantry and eliminated him on the spot, feeling that he had given up. Ramsay named both teams winners for recovering from their earlier setbacks and spared them due to Kevin's elimination. He did not comment on the latter's departure, but his burnt picture could be seen next to Keanu's.
306	8	"Young Guns: A Devilish Challenge"	July 19, 2021	HK-2008	2.68
Team Challenge: The teams participated in an impromptu dance party. Ramsay then revealed the challenge: they had 35 minutes to prepare five entrées from the Hell's Kitchen menu: beef Wellington, New York strip, pan-seared salmon, braised halibut and rack of lamb, relay style. Only two chefs were allowed in the kitchen at a time and they had to switch out every five minutes. The red team won three to one after the blue team poorly sliced the New York strip and undercooked the lamb. Reward/punishment: The red team went ziplining and ate lunch at the Off the Strip bistro. The blue team sorted through the trash for recyclables. Cook for Your Life: Ramsay called the chefs into his office one by one to evaluate their teammates. Josie, Keanu, Victoria, Emily and Sam were voted to participate in the Cook for Your Life challenge; they had 45 minutes to make a dish using the following ingredients: double-bone pork chop, Brussels sprouts, sweet potato, green apples and bourbon. Elimination: Ramsay sent Sam, Josie and Emily (who forgot to plate the Brussels sprouts) to the dorms. He eliminated Keanu for overcooking the pork chop, which she left on the grill so long it caught fire. Ramsay's comment: "Keanu has many of the important attributes required to be a great chef. But when her pork went up in flames, so did her chances of continuing in this competition."
307	9	"A Game Show from Hell"	August 9, 2021	HK-2009	2.54
Team Challenge: The teams played a game of Spell's Kitchen. In each round, one chef from each team had to decipher a scrambled ingredient on the screen. The winner had the choice of either keeping the ingredient for themselves or sending it to the other team. Each team had to cook six dishes using one of three proteins: ribeye, veal and sea bass. The blue team won six to three, scoring on all their dishes. Reward/punishment: The blue team spent the day relaxing in a hot tub at Drai's Beach Club. The red team baked bread for all of Ramsay's restaurants in Las Vegas and churned butter by hand. Service: For one night only, Hell's Kitchen hosted a private dinner service for two charities. The blue team cooked for the Stand Together Foundation, whose table included NFL Hall of Famer Deion Sanders, Bar Rescue host Jon Taffer and his wife Nicole who was uncredited. The red team cooked for Keep Memory Alive, whose table included Emmy-winning actor Brad Garrett. On lobster spaghetti, Kiya led effectively while Megan fell behind by 15 minutes after she forgot to start boiling the water. Antonio and Emily got out the pan-seared scallops without issues. On the mushroom risotto, Steve led well while Sam sent up inconsistent portion sizes. Victoria failed to speak up while leading the pan-seared snapper course, and Josie undercooked the snapper, causing Brynn to break down in tears. Trenton and Josie both got stalled by raw filet mignons, including Kiya cooking the filets before the snappers were served. A disappointed Ramsay declared no winner, and each team had to provide two nominees. Elimination: The red team nominated Brynn and Josie, and the blue team nominated Megan and Victoria. Ramsay sent Megan back in line and eliminated Victoria for being the most passive leader of the night. Ramsay's comment: "Victoria may have an impressive resume, but after her performance tonight there's one job she won't be adding to it — head chef at Gordon Ramsay Steak."
308	10	"More Than a Sticky Situation"	August 16, 2021	HK-2010	2.61
Team Challenge: In the dining room, which had been transformed into a classic movie theater, the teams were presented with a short video, leading to the next challenge: the blind taste test. While one chef tasted, one of their teammates sat in front of a popcorn box-shaped stand and would be dumped with caramel corn for two incorrect guesses and nachos for three. Antonio and Steve each scored one, resulting in Sam and Megan getting messy. Kiya and Trenton also scored one, resulting in Antonio and Steve getting messy. Megan and Emily beat Brynn and Josie respectively, three to two. In the last round, the blue team chose Megan to go against Sam, winning the challenge nine to six after Sam missed the first two ingredients. Reward/punishment: The blue team rode a VIP party bus to the Brooklyn Bowl bowling alley and were joined by Marino. The red team cleaned up the mess in the dining room. Brynn used her punishment pass to swap places with Steve. Service: Comedian Gabriel Iglesias and actress Melissa Joan Hart and her sister Emily dined at the blue and red chef's tables. The red team breezed through appetizers thanks to Kiya's strong leadership. On entrées however, Josie and Emily both fell behind on the salmon garnish, and Josie later brought garnish for one order of lamb instead of two. Steve served a dry risotto and refused to communicate with his teammates, forcing sous-chef Jason to assist him. The blue team had six minutes to serve the chef's table in order to avoid conflict with Iglesias' show. Steve continued to take a backseat, earning himself a trip to the storeroom and a threat of automatic elimination, but both teams finished service on a positive note. Ramsay selected Kiya and Megan as the Best of the Worst for stepping up as leaders, asking them to each nominate one teammate. Elimination: Kiya nominated Josie and Megan nominated Steve. Although he was frustrated with the latter's lack of communication throughout the dinner service, Ramsay eliminated the former for her declining performances but praised her passion. Ramsay's comment: "Josie may have come a long way in this competition, but right now she still needs more time to grow."
309	11	"Swiping Right"	August 23, 2021	HK-2011	2.54
Team Challenge: The teams were presented with a dating app interface. Each pair of chefs took turns matching four ingredients to one of four proteins: lobster, filet mignon, New York strip and pork chop. They then randomly selected a wild card from a dome of eight ingredients. They had 45 minutes to cook their dishes. Executive chef Richard Blais was the guest judge. The challenge ended in a tie at 2, and Blais picked Steve's grilled lobster with caviar butter as the best dish, giving the blue team the win. Reward/punishment: The blue team visited Qua Baths and Spa at Caesar's Palace and received Vitamix blenders. The red team cleaned the dorms and scrubbed the toilets. Service: The Ultimate Fighter host Megan Olivi, UFC flyweight contender Joseph Benavidez and Caesars Entertainment president of entertainment Jason Gastwirth attended service. Despite Megan having the risotto sent back and Emily falling behind on the steak and causing Steve's salmon to overcook, the blue team finished service on a strong note thanks to Steve's attention to detail. The red team breezed through appetizers thanks to Kiya's leadership but fell apart on entrées as Antonio and Sam undercooked the salmon and New York Strip, respectively. The latter then sent up overcooked and undercooked chicken while the former refused to help him, causing Ramsay to kick out the red team. Elimination: The red team nominated Antonio and Sam. Ramsay eliminated Sam for his poor performance on meat and his failure to respond when asked who was the weakest chef on his team. Ramsay's comment: "Sam struggled with chicken all night and then struggled to give me a straight answer. I had no struggle taking his jacket."
310	12	"All Hell Breaks Loose"	August 30, 2021	HK-2012	2.61
Ramsay announced, through a brief transformative magic stunt from former Opium performer LeeLoo, that the final seven would be competing for their black jackets; there were only five available, meaning two chefs would be eliminated. Black Jacket Challenge 1: The chefs took turns pulling a slot machine to determine the ingredients they had to cook with. Ramsay announced that the challenge winners would have their dishes featured on the menu of Sunseeker Resort in Port Charlotte, Florida, where they and their families would receive airfare and accommodations via Allegiant Air. Sunseeker vice president of food and beverage Jason Shkorupa was the guest judge. Steve's peppercorn-crusted New York strip was delicious but had too much heat from the Sichuan peppercorns, Megan's buerre blanc for her lobster tail lacked seasoning and Emily's poached shrimp was badly overcooked. Trenton's pan-roasted rack of lamb with Kalamata olive tapenade and Brynn's filet with mushroom and leek soup (despite the latter's inexperience with polenta) earned them the first two black jackets. Black Jacket Challenge 2: The remaining chefs played a game of craps; each rolled a multi-sided die with letters, then selected an ingredient beginning with the letter landed on. Ramsay rolled twice, choosing bluefin tuna as the protein and black truffles as a wild card. The other ingredients were rice, peppers, turnips, heirloom tomatoes and lemon. Steve's fennel-crusted tuna with tomato and black truffle risotto and shaved turnip salad was tasty but the tuna was sliced too thinly, Antonio's truffle tomato jam for his seared tuna was criticized and Emily's sushi roll, which became a tuna rice salad, was visually messy. Megan's sesame-seared tuna with balsamic soy glaze and Kiya's sesame-crusted tuna with jasmine rice and blistered tomatoes won the next two black jackets. Black Jacket Challenge 3: Antonio, Emily and Steve each received a video call from their loved ones back home. They were then asked to cook a dish inspired by their families. Antonio made enchiladas verdes with chicken thighs, Emily cooked a porterhouse steak with Brussels sprouts and Steve prepared shrimp and grits. Ramsay first eliminated Emily for unevenly cooking the steak, then gave Steve the final black jacket over Antonio, whose chicken was slightly underseasoned. Neither Emily nor Antonio received an elimination statement or the coat-hanging sequence.
311	13	"Social Media in Hell"	September 6, 2021	HK-2013	2.20
Individual challenge: The black jackets received cookware sets in the dorms before their first individual challenge the next day: prepare dishes that not only look good, but also taste good. Chef Ludo Lefebvre guest judged alongside Ramsay, and Ramsay uploaded pictures of the dishes to his Instagram account for his followers to vote on. Trenton and Megan both received perfect 10's from Ramsay and Lefevbre, but the fans preferred Trenton's dish over Megan's, giving him the challenge win. The other three dishes from worst to best were Steve, Kiya, Brynn. Reward/punishment: Trenton received a VIP tour of the Hell's Kitchen restaurant hosted by season 17 winner Michelle Tribble and a meatball-making master class, and chose to take Steve with him. Brynn, Kiya, and Megan were forced to prep for service by separating peppercorns by hand. Service: Aunt Chippy and Murray the Magician were among the diners in attendance. For their first service as a single team, Megan and Kiya performed strongly on appetizers. Brynn struggled to give a time on her halibut and broke down in tears, but nevertheless got the halibut accepted for Aunt Chippy's table. Trenton was unfamiliar with working in the red kitchen and communicated poorly from the garnish station until Ramsay intervened, while Steve also struggled to assert himself and overcooked Wellingtons. The black jackets regrouped to finish service on a high note, after which Ramsay requested two nominees for elimination. Elimination: Brynn and Steve were nominated. Ramsay eliminated Steve for not being as vocal as the other chefs, but praised his relentless attitude, allowing him to keep his jacket. Ramsay's comment: "Steve still has a lot to learn. Unfortunately tonight, he learned that silence in the kitchen isn't golden, it's goodbye."
312	14	"Hell Hath No Fury..."	September 6, 2021	HK-2014	2.09
Individual challenge: The final four were taken to a fake beach setup behind Hell's Kitchen, where they would have 45 minutes to cook and serve dishes for the beach guests, who would then vote for their favorite. The ranking from worst to best was Megan, Brynn, Kiya, Trenton; Trenton only beat Kiya by three votes. Reward/punishment: Trenton received a shopping spree and took Megan with him. Kiya and Brynn had to clean up the sand from the fake beach setting. Service: Carmen Electra attended this service. Before service, the final four each got a turn to yell at Ramsay. They were each given a chance to run the pass, with Ramsay and the sous-chefs testing their quality control as well. Brynn nearly cried again after failing to notice a tuna tartare in place of beef and also a salmon with no skin. Trenton missed the tuna tartare as well, but recovered after Ramsay told him to wake up, and proved to be a vocal, if occasionally abrasive, leader. Megan led strongly and was the only one to pass quality control: a risotto with orzo pasta instead of rice, and zucchini instead of peas in a carbonara. Kiya broke down in tears as well after missing a risotto with shrimp instead of lobster and a six-top ticket that was missing an entrée, prompting Ramsay to give her a pep talk in the storeroom. Eventually, service was completed with no further setbacks. Elimination: Ramsay asked the final four to have an open discussion about the recent service. After they each pled their cases, Ramsay named Megan and Trenton as the first two to advance. In a very tough decision, Ramsay then named Kiya as the third finalist and eliminated Brynn, whom he felt was not emotionally strong enough to lead as a head chef. Despite this, he praised her skill and passion, allowing her to keep her jacket. Ramsay's comment: "Brynn definitely has what it takes to be a great head chef. Once she learns to control her emotions, I know she will get there."
313	15	"What the Hell"	September 13, 2021	HK-2015	2.36
While celebrating in the dorms, the final three are summoned back to the kitchen by Ramsay, who gives them their final challenge: to design a menu consisting of one cold appetizer, one hot appetizer, one seafood dish, one red meat dish, and one surf and turf. They will each receive the help of a sous-chef: Megan got Christina, Kiya got Jason, and Trenton got season 17 winner Michelle Tribble, who appeared two episodes ago. Individual challenge: The next morning, the final three got to spend time with their families: Megan's parents, Kiya's mother and sister, and Trenton's father and girlfriend. They each get a full makeover before being transported to the site of their final challenge, where they would have an hour to cook their menus which would be scored one to ten by a panel of guest judges. Megan fell behind Trenton and Kiya on the appetizers, but closed the gap on Kiya as Trenton began to pull away, scoring an impressive 48 out of 50 possible points to earn the first spot in the final two. On the last dish Kiya held a 35–34 lead, but she only scored eight on her surf and turf after over-seasoning her filet, opening the door for Megan to claim the second spot in the finale with a perfect 10. Trenton and Megan picked their brigades for the final service from the last ten chefs eliminated. Trenton picked Kiya, Antonio, Brynn, and Sam. Megan picked Steve, Victoria, Emily, and was left with Josie.
314	16	"Two Young Guns Shoot It Out"	September 13, 2021	HK-2016	2.23
Megan and Trenton prepare their teams for the final service. Sous-chef Christina has to warn Megan about being too nice, while Trenton's brigade finds him too bossy, especially Kiya and Brynn, who are dealing with the emotions of not making it to the finals. Shortly before service begins, Ramsay calls Megan and Trenton up to the dorms, demanding to know who is responsible for a bag with what appears to be drugs and threatening disqualification, before revealing it was a joke and handing them their chef's jackets. Service: Both kitchens get through appetizers smoothly despite Victoria dragging on crab cakes and Antonio's undercooked risotto. During entrées, Josie overcooked and then undercooked ribeye, forcing Megan to switch her with Steve. Brynn served garnish too early, forcing Kiya to bring up her chicken before it was ready. When Kiya undercooked the chicken again, Trenton brought his entire team into the pantry for a scolding. Both teams rebounded to complete service on a strong note afterwards. Winner announced: After having reached a decision, Ramsay called down Megan and Trenton to his office and offered them praise for their hard work throughout the course of the competition. He asked them to stand in front of two separate doors and turn the handles. Trenton's door opened, making him the winner of season 20 of Hell's Kitchen; he is the first male winner since Scott Commings in season 12. Trenton celebrated his victory by proposing to his girlfriend, who enthusiastically said yes. Megan took her defeat graciously. Ramsay's comment: "Trenton is everything I could want in a protégé. At a very young age, he's already proven to be creative, passionate, and a driven leader. He will be a great asset at Gordon Ramsay Steak 2.0 at Paris Hotel and Casino in Las Vegas."
