= Hell's Kitchen (American TV series) season 18 =

Hell's Kitchen: Rookies vs. Veterans
- Season 18
- Promotional poster for season 18, featuring host Ramsay
- Hosted by: Gordon Ramsay
- No. of contestants: 16
- Winner: Ariel Contreras-Fox
- Runner-up: Mia Castro
- No. of episodes: 16

Release
- Original network: Fox
- Original release: September 28, 2018 – February 8, 2019

Season chronology
- ← Previous; All Stars Next → Las Vegas

The eighteenth season of the American competitive reality television series Hell's Kitchen (subtitled as Hell's Kitchen: Rookies vs. Veterans) premiered on Fox on September 28, 2018, and concluded on February 8, 2019. Gordon Ramsay returned as host and head chef, while James "Jocky" Petrie and Christina Wilson returned as the Blue Team and Red Team's sous-chefs respectively. Marino Monferrato returned as maître d'. This season featured eight new contestants (rookies) battling eight returning veterans. It is also the last season to be shot in California until Season 21 where the show returned to the state for two more seasons.

The season was won by season six third-place finisher Ariel Contreras-Fox, with private chef Mia Castro finishing second.

== Chefs ==
Sixteen chefs competed in season 18.

=== Rookies ===
Contestant	Age (Note: Age at the time of filming)	Occupation	Hometown	Result
Mia Castro	28	Private Chef	Miami Beach, Florida	Runner-up
Chris Motto	35	Executive Chef	Baton Rouge, Louisiana	Quit before finals
Kanae Houston	25	Sous Chef	Los Angeles, California	Eliminated after Black Jackets challenge
Jose DeJesus	34	Chef de Cuisine	Bronx, New York	Eliminated after eighth service
Scotley Innis	35	Sous Chef	Atlanta, Georgia	Eliminated after seventh service
Elizabeth "Gizzy" Barton	32	Sous Chef	Atlanta, Georgia	Eliminated after "Cook For Your Life" challenge
Chris Mendonca	25	Executive Chef	Boston, Massachusetts	Quit before fifth service
Scott Popovic	39	Executive Chef	Cleveland, Ohio	Eliminated after first service

=== Veterans ===
Contestant	Age	Occupation	Hometown	Competed	Finished	Result
Ariel Contreras-Fox	36	Chef de Cuisine	Brooklyn, New York	Season 6	3rd	Winner
Bret Hauser	33	Personal Chef	Fort Lauderdale, Florida	Season 14	11th	Eliminated before finals
Heather Williams	28	Executive Chef	Easton, Pennsylvania	Season 16	Runner-up	Eliminated after tenth service
Trevor "Trev" McGrath	38	Lead Chef	New York, New York	Season 8	4th	Eliminated after ninth service
Rosanne "Roe" DiLeo	36	Head Chef	Dallas, Texas	Season 13	5th	Eliminated after sixth service
Torrece "T" Gregoire	34	Director of Operations Chef	Draper, Virginia	Season 14	Runner-up	Eliminated after fifth service
Kevin Cottle	44	Executive Chef	Middletown, Connecticut	Season 6	Runner-up	Eliminated after fourth service
Jen Gavin	34	Private Concert Catering Chef	Chicago, Illinois	Season 4	4th	Ejected during second service

== Contestant progress ==
No.	Chef	Original teams			1st switch							2nd switch	Individuals		Finals
No.	Chef	1801/1802	1803	1804	1805	1806	1807	1808	1809	1810	1811	1812	1813	1814	1815/1816
1	Ariel	WIN	WIN	LOSE	WIN	LOSE	IN	LOSE	WIN	WIN	WIN	IN	IN	IN	WINNER
2	Mia	LOSE	WIN	LOSE	WIN	LOSE	IN	NOM	WIN	WIN	WIN	IN	NOM	IN	RUNNER-UP
3	Bret	WIN	WIN	LOSE	LOSE	WIN	NOM	WIN	LOSE	LOSE	NOM	IN	IN	OUT	Ariel's team
4	Motto	LOSE	WIN	LOSE	LOSE	WIN	IN	WIN	LOSE	LOSE	LOSE	IN	IN	LEFT	Ariel's team
5	Heather	WIN	WIN	LOSE	WIN	NOM	NOM	LOSE	WIN	WIN	WIN	IN	OUT		Mia's team
6	Kanae	LOSE	WIN	LOSE	WIN	LOSE	IN	LOSE	WIN	WIN	WIN	OUT			Ariel's team
7	Trev	WIN	WIN	NOM	LOSE	WIN	IN	WIN	NOM	NOM	OUT				Mia's team
8	Jose	NOM	WIN	LOSE	LOSE	WIN	NOM	WIN	NOM (Note: Jose was also nominated by the team)	OUT					Mia's team
9	Scotley	LOSE	WIN	LOSE	NOM	WIN	NOM	WIN	OUT						Ariel's team
10	Roe	WIN	WIN	LOSE	WIN	LOSE	NOM	OUT							Mia's team
11	Gizzy	LOSE	WIN	NOM	WIN	LOSE	OUT								
12	T	WIN	WIN	LOSE	WIN	OUT									
13	Chris	NOM	WIN	NOM	LOSE	LEFT (Note: Chris withdrew from the competition for medical reasons)									
14	Kevin	WIN	WIN	NOM	OUT										
15	Jen	WIN	EJEC												
16	Scott	OUT													

Keywords

- WIN = Won the dinner service
- LOSE = Lost the dinner service
- IN = not nominated for elimination
- NOM = nominated for elimination
- OUT = eliminated normally
- LEFT = withdrew from competition
- HOSP = eliminated due to hospitalization
- EJEC = eliminated during service

Color key
Chef was eliminated after regular nomination
Chef was eliminated after Ramsay's nomination
Chef was eliminated without nomination
Chef was eliminated from winning team
Chef was eliminated in the Cook For Your Life challenge
Chef was nominated to participate in the Cook For Your Life challenge
Chef was eliminated during service
Chef withdrew from the competition
Chef was the Best of the Best/Worst
Chef was retained after regular nomination
Chef was retained after Ramsay's nomination
Chef's nomination was voided
The winner of Hell's Kitchen
The runner-up of Hell's Kitchen

== Episodes ==
No. overall	No. in season	Title	Original release date	Prod. code	U.S. viewers (millions)
267	1	"Rookies vs. Veterans"	September 28, 2018	HK-1801	2.98
16 chefs arrived at Hell's Kitchen, and were greeted by Marino and the sous-chefs, who served them butternut squash risotto for lunch. After lunch, Ramsay revealed himself and announced the grand prize for that season--the executive chef position at the first-ever Hell's Kitchen restaurant at Caesars Palace in Las Vegas. After half of the chefs (the rookies) explained their credentials, the other half revealed themselves to actually be returning chefs from previous seasons (the veterans), much to the rookies' shock. Ramsay then revealed that for the first time, he would be pitting the rookies against the veterans (rather than men against women), with the former cooking in the red kitchen under sous-chef Christina, and the latter cooking in the blue kitchen under sous-chef Jocky. Team challenge/signature dish: For this season, the veterans had to recreate the rookies' signature dishes. The rookies not only received the ingredients they wanted but also got to pick which veteran they wanted to cook against. Both teams had 45 minutes to cook their dishes, to be rated on a scale from 1–5. The challenge ended in a tie at 29 points, only the second such occurrence, after season 8. This was the first time in Hell's Kitchen history that nobody's signature dish received the minimum score. For the tiebreaker, Ramsay called up Mia and Kevin, who had the best dish on each team, and after a second look, he gave Mia's dish the edge, and the rookies won their first challenge. Reward/punishment: The rookies celebrated their challenge win with dinner at Charcoal in Venice Beach with Ramsay and Michelin-starred chef Josiah Citrin. The veterans were tasked with shelling thousands of sunflower seeds for the tableside pesto appetizer and preparing the mushroom duxelles for the beef wellington. Jen earned her teammates' ire for costing them the challenge, pureeing the mushrooms for the duxelles without cleaning them and giving an attitude to sous-chef Jocky. She and Bret started to get on each other's nerves over their conflicting personalities but started to warm up to him when he revealed his tattoos in memory of his deceased parents. Challenge – Part 1: The teams were greeted to a Scottish funeral being held in the dining room. As Ramsay was about to reveal someone near and dear they were saying goodbye to, the episode ends on a cliffhanger.
268	2	"A Fond Farewell"	October 5, 2018	HK-1802	2.66
Challenge – Part 2: Continuing from the previous episode, Ramsay revealed that the lobster risotto, which had been a staple dish since the beginning of the series, was going to be retired. Instead, each chef would have an opportunity to prepare their own risotto to be added to the menu for the entire season, with the winner also receiving a punishment pass, a one-time advantage that would allow the bearer to skip out on a punishment and join the winning team on their reward. The chefs had 45 minutes to cook their risottos, and Ramsay had each sous-chef taste the dishes on their team and pick the top four. The rookies were represented by Chris, Gizzy, Mia and Scott, while the veterans were represented by T, Roe, Ariel and Bret. In the end, Bret's tomato risotto with grilled shrimp and asparagus beat out Mia's basil and split pea risotto with pancetta and he won the challenge, although his emotional celebration annoyed the rookies. Before service: Before service began, the sous-chefs called both teams down to discuss the new menu items but had to lecture the rookies for arriving late and separated. While prepping for service, sous-chef Jocky became irritated with Trev for improperly scoring the wellingtons, while Christina advised the rookies to use the veterans' arrogance to their advantage. Service: Singer Don McLean, actors Annie Wersching, Kyle Schmid and model Courtney Sixx attended opening night. A shrimp and pasta appetizer was served tableside by Roe and Scotley. T served a risotto with more cheese than tomato and Trev served mushy scallops in a small frying pan, but both recovered. On entrees, Bret accidentally sliced the lamb chop before bringing it to the pass, and Jen was late to deliver the pork chop sauce. Nevertheless, the veterans finished service on a high note. In the red kitchen, Scott only fired one serving of shrimp for two risottos on order, then cooked two portions despite one having already been served and then was caught cooking more shrimp for the tableside station despite it being Scotley's responsibility. The problems continued on entrees as Jose undercooked the halibut, Chris wrote down cooking times instead of helping Mia on meat and a communication breakdown occurred when nobody could recite an order correctly. After Mia undercooked the lamb, Ramsay finally had seen enough of the rookies' fragmented performance and threw them out of the kitchen, asking them for two nominees. Elimination: The rookies nominated Scott and Chris, while Ramsay also called down Jose. During the pleas, Chris revealed that nine months prior to the competition, he had suffered a major accident that destroyed 90% of his face and also affected his memory. Ramsay was sympathetic but made it clear that he needed to fight back. Ultimately, he sent both Chris and Jose back in line and eliminated Scott for being confused all night and failing to uphold his impressive resume (Ramsay was especially displeased with him not understanding that Scotley's tableside dish did not require any cooking in the kitchen, which he made a point of to him in explaining his decision). Ramsay's comment: "Scott remembers working with some of the biggest named chefs in the world. But whether they would remember him is another matter entirely. I know I won't remember him by tomorrow."
269	3	"Hell's Riders"	October 12, 2018	HK-1803	2.67
Team Challenge: The teams were tasked with cooking lunch for the Marine Corps. The menu included entrees that represented the air, land and sea: chicken parmesan with angel hair pasta, New York strip and fritters and fish and chips. In the rookies' kitchen, Scotley constantly micromanaged Mia on fish and his misdirection eventually caused a paper towel to catch fire. Gizzy was lectured for waiting for the water to boil before adding the pasta. Things were bumpier for the veterans as Jen overdressed the salad leading Heather, who was supposed to be on French fries, to jump on the station much to Jen's annoyance. Kevin rushed Heather after she forgot to delegate her station, causing an order of raw fries to be sent back. Roe served soggy fish, but the veterans rallied behind Kevin's leadership. Ariel sent up a cold steak on the last ticket, allowing the rookies time to complete service first and win their second challenge in a row. Reward/punishment: The rookies were rewarded with a trip to Paramount Ranch, where they would star in their own Western movie called "Hell's Riders" alongside Marino. Bret was offered the chance to join them using his punishment pass and he accepted, irritating his teammates, who were tasked with preparing calamari for a tableside appetizer. Jen walked out of prep and broke down in tears after getting into an argument with Heather and Ariel over how to prepare a beurre blanc (ironically, they thought Jen's from the last prep session was better). Before service began, Ramsay and the sous chefs showed everyone the "Hell's Riders" trailer. Service: Actor Aly Michalka attended service despite not being credited. Mia and Ariel served grilled calamari tableside. Both teams had relatively little trouble with appetizers, except for Motto cooking the risotto off the stove and making it too crunchy, and Trev taking too long to assemble the cold appetizers, with Ramsay chiding him for taking a sip of water. On entrees, Jen sent up bland mashed potatoes for the first table, argued about it with Heather and sous-chef Jocky when they tasted for her and when Ramsay came in to check on the team, snidely asked what he was about to yell at her for. Scotley provided inconsistent times on the beef wellington, which caused Gizzy to overcook the halibut, and Ramsay replaced her on the fish station with Jose. Mia entered the kitchen after finishing the tableside orders, helping Kanae catch up on garnish and Jose repeat an order from sous-chef Christina. Automatic elimination: Jen stalled the veterans on garnish, refusing to give a clear time before having her garnish sent back as she only brought one portion for two ducks on order. When the former argued that she did send up enough leeks, Ramsay pulled the pan out from under the pass and showed the entire team, but she accused him of throwing the pan there to sabotage her. Enraged by this, the latter dropped the pan on the floor and escorted the veterans to the pantry while Jen unleashed a verbal tirade, continuing to insist that he had set her up to look bad. Ramsay promptly ordered her to remove her jacket and leave through the front door. Jen became the ninth chef to be eliminated during service. Afterwards, the veterans got their entrees out more quickly and neither kitchen made another error. After service, Ramsay informed the chefs that he sent Jen home for attacking his reputation. Then for the second time in two seasons, he declared both teams winners after an automatic disqualification, in lieu of the nomination process. Unlike the other chefs who got eliminated during service, Jen still got her coat hung and picture burned at the end of the episode. Ramsay's comment: “Jen accused me of sabotaging her. The truth of the matter is, the only thing that sabotaged Jen tonight was her cooking.”
270	4	"Hell Freezes Over"	October 19, 2018	HK-1804	2.54
Everyone expressed shock over Jen's disrespectful attitude that led to her early departure. Chris, Jose and Scotley relaxed in the hot tub while taking turns hitting on Mia, with Trev reassuring her that the two of them would get black jackets but not the other three. Team Challenge: The sous-chefs handed winter jackets to the chefs, who went outside to find that Ramsay had setup an artificial snow slope. He asked each team to take four runs down the slope in sleds; the veterans finished first and they were given a 10-second headstart to grab ingredients for the challenge, where each chef had 45 minutes to prepare a soup. James Beard Award winner Traci Des Jardins and Olympic gold medalist Brian Boitano were the guest judges; each would rate the soups from 1–3 stars. The veterans received a total of 41 stars, but Roe and Bret scored the minimum three stars due to insufficient seasoning and canned tomatoes, respectively. (Ironically, Bret saw a fellow competitor make the same mistake in the signature dish challenge back in season 14.) Thanks to perfect nines by Mia and Gizzy, the rookies overtook the veterans before Kanae's soup was tasted. Kanae also scored a nine to make the final score 51–41, and it was the rookies' third challenge win in a row. Reward/punishment: The rookies were rewarded with a day and night of pampering at L'Horizon Resort and Spa in Palm Springs and dinner at Sopa, while the veterans had to shovel out the snow and prepare both kitchens for service. Bret took his poor performance very personally, drawing his teammates' ire. Trev struggled to poach eggs during prep, earning Sous-Chef Jocky's criticism once again. Service: Actor Hayley Orrantia attended service. In addition, each team received VIP guests at their respective chef's table: the Blue Team had actor/comedians Cheryl Hines and Rachael Harris, and the Red Team had filmmaker Morgan Spurlock in his final TV appearance. Gizzy and Bret served tableside clam chowder but both struggled. The former was criticized for entering the kitchen while attempting to help Mia with flatbreads, while the latter worked slowly, socialized with the customers, and held up his team. Scotley and Mia argued over appetizers, prompting Sous-Chef Christina to intervene. On entrees, Chris forgot about a pork chop for the chef's table that Ramsay had put into the oven before service opened, and the latter found it burned completely black. Kevin served a cold New York strip, while Motto served an overcooked steak but recovered. On the next ticket, Kevin brought overcooked and undercooked lamb chops to the pass while rejecting Trev's assistance, leading Ramsay to march the entire blue team into the pantry. When Kevin served the lamb raw again, Ramsay stepped in to cook it himself. Even though nobody was ejected, both teams were declared losers due to their careless errors and regression from the previous week. Team Change: The blue team nominated Kevin and Trev, while the red team nominated Chris and Gizzy. Ramsay first asked Kevin and Gizzy for their jackets, then for Trev's jacket, only to send all of them to the opposite team. He then sent Mia and Kanae to the Blue Team and Bret to the red, effectively ending the Rookies vs. Veterans experiment in favor of the traditional battle of the sexes, only that the men are now the red team and the women are the blue team. This is the most people in the show's history to switch teams in a single season with six, a record that would be broken in season 21. Notably, Trev was also temporarily transferred to the Red Team during his first Hell's Kitchen appearance. Ramsay's comment: "Rookies, veterans... the only title I really care about is executive chef. It's time to see who will lead and who will fall."
271	5	"Fish Out of Water"	November 2, 2018	HK-1805	2.50
Jose and Kevin reflected on the impact their kids have had on their lives. Team Challenge: The chefs were greeted with a performance from composer Stephan Moccio. Marino and the sous-chefs dropped a giant plastic fish from the ceiling, introducing the challenge: the seven chefs on each team would cook halibut in a different manner. Ramsay brought in David Lefevre as a guest judge. Motto beat Heather on pan-seared to keep the men's hopes alive, but T beat Trev on oven-baked, giving the women their first challenge win of the season, 5–3. Reward/punishment: The women went on a virtual reality adventure and received Vitamix blenders, while the men had to compost food waste in manure; during the punishment, it started raining. Motto was the only one not to complain about the work, as he grew up on a farm and was used to it. Service: Actors Carly Hughes and Sarah Shahi sat in the blue dining room, and Stephanie Beatriz in the red. Chris and Heather served tableside mussels, but the former was scolded for loitering in the dining room waiting for tableside orders instead of helping in the kitchen. However, none of his teammates wanted his help until Kevin let him take over on the fish. Nonetheless, he still managed to send raw scallops. In the blue kitchen, Ariel brought up two orders of scallops not knowing that T had overcooked one. However, T managed to quickly recover and serve acceptable scallops. On entrees, Mia checked multiple wellingtons by slicing them in the middle instead of at the ends, prompting Ramsay to warn her teammates to communicate with her. Gizzy's concerns over her undercooking her lamb chops caused T to momentarily take over, but Ramsay confirmed they were perfect, and proceeded to lecture the former over not letting latter drive her section. Other than that, the women finished service with no further issues. The men had a much bumpier service. Bret served perfect wellingtons, but Scotley failed to communicate with him on garnish and misinformed Kevin to cook one salmon when two were on order. Realizing the mistake, Kevin tried drenching the second salmon in butter to get it up in time, but it was still raw. Ramsay proceeded to take over the ticket and sent the men into the pantry to regroup, where Scotley irked Kevin by stating that he couldn't keep an eye on the pass anymore. After Bret served a cold wellington sauce, a frustrated Ramsay threw the men out while the women finished their last ticket. After service, Ramsay pulled Gizzy aside and advised her to find her voice. Elimination: The men nominated Scotley and Kevin, although Motto pushed for Bret to go up for getting the team kicked out. After a tough decision, Kevin was eliminated for being nominated twice in a row and not showing the same passion and desire as he did back in season 6. Before Kevin left, Ramsay gave him encouragement and told him that he was already a successful and talented chef outside Hell's Kitchen. Ramsay's comment: "Kevin was a standout in his first time in Hell's Kitchen. Unfortunately, this time around, he seemed more determined to head back to the ski slopes than to the Las Vegas Strip."
272	6	"Hot Potato"	November 9, 2018	HK-1806	2.82
Team Challenge: For their next challenge, both teams had to make a dish featuring potato as the main ingredient. They were given 30 seconds to collect plastic body parts for their own Mr. Potato Head toy, and 45 minutes to cook a dish using the selected ingredients. Former Top Chef contestant Richard Blais was invited as a guest judge; each judge would award each chef between one and five points. Because they had an extra member, the Blue Team dropped Kanae's scallops and purple mashed potato due to the clunky presentation. The challenge ended in a tie, 40–40, but Ramsay and Blais deemed Chris' lobster shepherd's pie the best dish overall, and the men won. Afterward, the judges tasted Kanae's dish and told the women, who saw T and Gizzy score only three points each, that it would have received eight had it been used. Reward/punishment: The men visited the animal sanctuary Animal Tracks and ate lunch at gourmet food truck NoMad, while the women had to prep hundreds of pounds of potatoes for Steak Night. Kanae got frustrated with T, as it was the latter who not only underperformed but also pushed the hardest to drop the former's dish. Chris's Exit: Returning from the reward, Chris informed sous-chef Christina that he wished to leave the competition, as he had not fully recovered from his accident nine months ago and was experiencing emotional turmoil. After being informed by Christina, Ramsay allowed Chris to leave to seek treatment for his mental health, although he was upset by his decision. This made him the 10th chef to withdraw from Hell's Kitchen, and the first to do so since his teammate Bret, in season 14. Ramsay did not issue a statement on his departure, but his hung jacket and already-burnt picture could be seen next to T and Scotley's when they were later eliminated. Service: Country singer Kelsea Ballerini sat at the red chef's table and actor Cornelius Smith Jr. sat at the blue. Actor Titus Welliver also attended service as one of the red diners. Despite being shorthanded five to seven, the men had a near-perfect service, with Ramsay in particular praising Jose and Trev on appetizers and meat respectively. The only problems were Motto briefly forgetting entree orders until Ramsay got him back on track, and Scotley improperly scoring some of his fish, which he attempted to blame Trev for. On the other side, Mia turned in a strong performance on appetizers. However, the women completely stalled on entrees. Kanae's branzino for the firefighter six-top fell apart; she then undercooked the refire. Their service went further south when T and Heather's filets came out raw and overcooked repeatedly, frustrating the former to the point of refusing to communicate with the latter, feeling that she wasn't doing her job properly. But T brought up another raw steak on the very next ticket, driving Ramsay past the breaking point, and he proceeded to kick the women out of the kitchen and task them with naming two nominees for elimination. Elimination: The women considered Kanae but ultimately nominated T and Heather, disappointing Ramsay as both of them were runners-up in their previous seasons. He eliminated T for her poor performance on meat and refusal to communicate with Heather during service. He then told her that while she was a very talented chef, he couldn't look past the fact that all the other chefs were performing better than her, meaning that she didn't have the same strength she had back in season 14. Ramsay's comment: "As a former runner-up, I expected T to come back full of swagger and skill. Sadly, she came back with double the swagger, but only a fraction of the skill."
273	7	"Last Chef Standing"	November 16, 2018	HK-1807	2.81
Team Challenge: To illustrate the importance of teamwork, Ramsay provided the chefs a pit stop demonstration. He then gave them 40 minutes to cook five entrees from the menu: spaghetti meatball marinara, veal scallopini piccata, crispy fried chicken, shrimp and grits and cioppino. Since the blue team had an extra member, Gizzy volunteered to sit out. Every 8 minutes, each team had to kick out one member at a time, until only Motto and Ariel were left in their respective kitchens; with 90 seconds to go, Ramsay allowed the chefs back into their kitchens for plating. The women won the challenge, four to three, as Trev forgot to plate the fish for the men's cioppino, reminiscent of a similar error he made during Season 8's Taste It, Now Make It challenge. Reward/punishment: The women went go-kart racing while the men were forced to take in a delivery of corn and peas and shuck them for service. During the punishment, Trev suffered a mild allergic reaction and sous-chef Christina sent him to see a medic, but Scotley was unsympathetic due to the former already costing them the challenge, even mocking him by calling him a "baby girl". Cook For Your Life Challenge: For the second season in a row, the Cook For Your Life Challenge took the place of a normal dinner service. This time, Ramsay put on the block the first three chefs from each team to leave the kitchen during the previous challenge. These were Bret, Jose and Scotley from the men, and Gizzy, Roe and Heather from the women. The six chefs had 45 minutes to shop for ingredients in the farmers' market setup in the dining room and create their own entrees. Elimination: Both Bret's frutti di mare pasta and Heather's coconut curry-poached lobster tail beat out Roe's grilled swordfish, but Roe beat out Gizzy's rustic grilled bass with delicata squash. Jose's pan-seared salmon with chorizo hash also beat out Gizzy, leaving her to go against Scotley, who had taken over her position in Atlanta. In the end, the former's ahi tuna with red lentils won out, and the latter was eliminated for leaving the scales on the bass. Before leaving, Ramsay told Gizzy that while she came into the competition strong, she soon lost her confidence later on (as evidenced by her decision to sit out of the team challenge and the lack of creativity and conviction in her dish) but urged her not to give up on her dreams. Ramsay's comment: "I had such high hopes for Gizzy from Day One, but if she doesn't truly believe in herself, then I can't believe in her either."
274	8	"One Hell of a Party"	December 7, 2018	HK-1808	2.68
Trev expressed disappointment that Scotley was not eliminated, while Mia took exception to Bret cussing and calling her "sweetheart". Team Challenge: After showing pictures of the chefs (along with the staff and Ramsay himself) in their teenage years, Ramsay announced for that night's service, he was hosting his youngest daughter Tilly's Sweet 16th birthday party. Both teams had to create a tasting menu for the party, consisting of two appetizers, two meat entrees, and one vegetarian entree, with one point being awarded for each dish that Tilly chose to put on the menu. During the challenge, Tilly asked two things of her dad: that all the guests receive personal-sized four-layer cakes and that he control his swearing during dinner service. Motto's confetti tuna and Kanae's Asian kebabs scored over Roe's and Scotley's scallops (due to being served with ricotta cheese and being raw, respectively). Tilly also picked Mia's creamy mushroom fricassee with crispy tofu over Trev's broccoli and bok choy masala because she loved mushrooms, as well as Jose's fish and chips and Heather's filet mignon and red onion jam. The women won the challenge, four to two, after Tilly picked Ariel's grilled chicken and sweet potato haystack over Bret's baked ziti, which she found to be too rich. Reward/punishment: The women spent the day at a Malibu mansion with a drive-by from the Van Leeuwen artisan ice cream truck, much to Mia's delight, while the men had to make folding paper decorations along with the four-layered cakes Tilly asked for, and also set up a mobile photo booth for the party guests. During the punishment, Bret suffered from a rapid heartbeat, requiring medical attention. However, he refused to go to the hospital for further testing after his symptoms subsided, not wanting a repeat of season 14 when a serious back injury forced him to withdraw from Hell's Kitchen. Dinner service: Actor Thomas Barbusca was at tonight's service. The men had their second near-perfect service in a row, thanks to strong performances from Scotley on appetizers, Jose on meat and Motto on fish. Bret burned the sweet potato fries and Trev put too much garlic in the pan of spinach after ignoring Scotley's warning, but both quickly recovered. The women got through appetizers fine despite Kanae requiring Heather's help after poorly slicing the ahi tuna, but fell apart on entrees. Roe served undercooked the steak twice, earning the entire team a trip to the pantry. Mia's first attempt at the fish didn't have enough batter, and the refire was raw. When Ariel sent up a raw halibut for Tilly's table, Ramsay lost his temper and kicked the women out of the kitchen as the three rookies on the men's team--Scotley, Motto, and Jose--completed their remaining tables for them. Elimination: The women nominated Roe and Mia for elimination, despite Roe pushing for Ariel to go up for getting the team kicked out. During her plea, Mia falsely accused Kanae of not properly setting up the fish station. Nevertheless, Ramsay sent the former back in line and eliminated the latter for her poor performance on meat, ironically her strongest station when she appeared in season 13. Ramsay's comment: “Last time she was here, Roe was a tour de force on the meat station. But tonight, her performance left me as cold as a raw New York strip.”
275	9	"What Happens in Vegas"	December 14, 2018	HK-1809	2.66
Mia and Kanae got into an argument in the dorms over the former throwing the latter under the bus during the previous elimination, as Ariel and Heather broke it up. Team Challenge: The teams were introduced to the Chinese food challenge with a performance from the Immortals Lion Dance troupe. Selected chefs pick an opponent to cook against, and the opponent pick one of the following proteins: spot prawns, black cod, pork tenderloin, duck breast and chicken breast. The chefs were then given a Chinese takeout box containing eight fortune cookies and 45 minutes to prepare a dish using the ingredients inside the boxes. Scotley was the extra member on the Red Team not picked, so he was assigned chicken breast, and the Blue Team had to select one of their members to cook the extra chicken dish, which turned out to be Kanae. Chef Shirley Chung was the guest judge. In the last round, Kanae beat Jose with her poached prawns and cold cashew sauce to give the women their third consecutive challenge win. Reward/punishment: The women flew to Las Vegas with sous-chef Christina and stayed at a private villa in the Nobu hotel, while the men had to make fortune cookies from scratch. Scotley who felt very dismayed from failing to win the challenge and not getting the opportunity to spend time in Las Vegas did very little during the punishment, even taking a break to make burgers for a snack and then boiling some of the eggs earmarked for the fortune cookies. This angered Trev, who voiced his concerns about Scotley's lazy behaviour and his inability of being a team player during the punishment to Heather in the dorm. The next day, Trev annoyed his teammates by constantly ordering them around way too much during dinner prep. Dinner service: Olympic gold medalists David Plummer and Allison Schmitt and Los Angeles Kings players Tanner Pearson and Tyler Toffoli attended service, as well as a ten-top occupied by Beacher's Madhouse performers that both teams had to serve at the same time. Other than Kanae dropping two scallops on the first table of appetizers and not understanding Ramsay's command “out in one”, the women had a near flawless performance thanks to Ariel on meat, serving their half of the ten-top well before the men did. The men, on the other hand, struggled all night due to their lack of cohesion, especially Trev and Jose on fish struggling to push out the scallops and salmon to the point of Ramsay questioning who was running the station. Scotley tore the pastry on the beef wellington while slicing it, so Bret had to show him how to slice them. His next attempt was raw, so Ramsay compared them to Ariel's wellingtons to make a further example. After the women finished service, Ramsay brought them into the red kitchen to help the men. He then kicked out the latter after Jose undercooked the salmon. The women served nearly two-thirds of the red tables in addition to all their own. Elimination: The men nominated Scotley and Trev while Jose also received serious consideration. Ramsay was disappointed in Trev and Scotley for arguing over each other's behavior during the punishment, but sent the former back in line after hearing his plea. Even though Jose was the worst performer of the night, Ramsay eliminated Scotley for his declining performances after a strong start, his failure to back up his big talk and his lazy and selfish attitude during the men's punishment that Trev criticized him for earlier. Ramsay's comment: "I really hoped that Scotley would be the Big Bad Wolf at my restaurant in Las Vegas. But after his performance tonight, I could not let him in, not by the hair on my chinny chin chin."
276	10	"Poor Trev"	January 4, 2019	HK-1810	2.50
Team Challenge: Ramsay revealed that the 18th annual Blind Taste Test would be the teams' next challenge, and this season the chefs tasted gelatos infused with different flavors. As one chef from each team tasted, one of their teammates sat on a stool and would have spaghetti, marinara sauce and Parmesan cheese dumped on them respectively should the taster get multiple incorrect answers. Trev failed to score any points, resulting in Jose getting all three ingredients dumped on him, while Heather got two, with Kanae getting blasted with only spaghetti. Motto scored an impressive three, but Mia continued her hot streak in challenges with a perfect four, becoming the fourth chef in Hell's Kitchen to achieve such a feat. Ariel scored three over Bret's two, resulting in Motto getting blasted with spaghetti. In the final round, while both Jose and Kanae identified coffee, the women won the challenge 10–6, as there weren't enough ingredients left for the men to catch up. Reward/punishment: The women went to Descanso Garden Spa in Southern California for a day of pampering, while the men had to clean up the mess in the dining room, set up the 12-tops, polish all the silverware for the private dinner service and make gelato by hand. Trev suffered a crisis of confidence as a result of costing his team the challenge, believing he couldn't win without showing he had a decent palate but was calmed down and encouraged by Heather in the dorms. During the punishment, he suffered a lot of merciless teasing and mocking from his teammates after breaking the ice cream churner, but knew he had to bounce back. Dinner service: For one night only, Hell's Kitchen was closed for a charity night service. The men cooked for St. Jude Children's Research Hospital, whose table featured TV host Sabrina Soto and actors Kevin Zegers and Parker Young. The women cooked for the Waterkeeper Alliance, whose table featured actors Dylan Bruno, Camryn Manheim, her son Milo who was not mentioned in this service, and actor/director Chad Lowe. The menu that night was a five-course Italian meal, with each chef in charge of a course. On the scallops course, Mia led effectively although sometimes too quietly for Ramsay's liking. Motto was derailed by Trev serving scallops seared on only one side and the entire team plating slowly. After the course was served, Ramsay discovered an entire tray of wasted scallops, prompting Trev and Bret to argue over who was responsible. Both Ariel and Bret led the branzino course with only minor problems; Kanae took the foil off of one tray of fish, nearly letting it get cold, while some of Jose's salad was bruised. Trev led the truffle carbonara course vocally and effectively, with Ramsay calling it the best-executed course so far, but Kanae was slowed by Heather putting unequal amounts of pasta on each plate, forcing the team to restart plating. On the veal saltimbocca course, Heather had no problems. However, Jose struggled to give her and Ramsay accurate timings and failed to check the veal chops, which led to seven of them, including Soto's, being returned for being raw. Infuriated and embarrassed, Ramsay cooked the refires himself as both teams got the tiramisu soufflé dessert out. The men were named clear losers and asked for two nominees. Elimination: Trev announced that the nominees were Jose and, much to Ramsay's shock, himself. His teammates all wanted him gone, blaming him for the burnt scallops and raw veal, but Ramsay ultimately sent the former back in line and eliminated the latter, much to everyone else's chagrin, for failing to show leadership on his course and allowing the raw veal to leave the kitchen without checking them first, but gave him encouragement. Ramsay's comment: "On a night when it should have been Hell's Kitchen giving back to some amazing charities, it was charities that ended up giving back Jose's raw veal."
277	11	"Devilish Desserts"	January 11, 2019	HK-1811	2.92
Team Challenge: The challenge was a three-on-three showdown to see which team could make the better lineup of desserts to impress Ramsay and chocolatier Valerie Gordon, each of whom would score each dessert on a 1–5 scale. Since blue team had an extra member, they dropped Heather's unappetizing-looking bread pudding. Motto's s'mores-inspired bread pudding gave the men an early 7–3 lead, but Bret's white chocolate and vanilla arancini balls were severely undercooked and Trev's chocolate-avocado "kisses" tasted awful, each scoring the minimum two. Despite Kanae's deconstructed tiramisu and Mia's apple and mascarpone tart also receiving poor reviews, Ariel's Thai lime and beet tart scored seven to lift the women to a 14–11 victory. Reward/punishment: The women had lunch at Joey Woodland Hills with sous-chef Jocky and then went on a $2,000 shopping spree ($500 per team member) at the high-end culinary store Sur La Table. Heather was in a poor mood almost the entire time due to her dessert being left out of the challenge, even though her team still managed to win without it. The men had to break down 600 pounds of ice by hand into ice cubes for cocktails for service. Bret and Motto were so annoyed by Trev's lack of cooperation in carrying out the task (even though the latter had insisted on doing his part of the task on his own) and mocked him both to his face and behind his back. Before service, Trev expressed his concerns to sous-chef Christina about earning his teammates' respect and asked if it would be possible to discuss opportunities for advancement after the competition. Dinner service: The service featured VIP guests: actor Randall Park at the blue chef's table and Super Bowl MVP Malcolm Smith at the red. Both teams got through appetizers with no trouble, save for Mia being unable to taste the risotto due to her shellfish allergy; Ramsay suggested that Mia cook the carbonara and Ariel take the risotto instead. On entrees, Heather overcooked the New York strip and Ramsay stepped in after Kanae undercooked the salmon for the chef's table, but the women finished service with no further problems. The men, on the other hand, were plagued by miscommunication and lack of cohesion all night. Trev brought a raw wellington to the pass after Bret and Motto ignored his requests for a time. On the next ticket, he forgot to put the herb crust on the lamb chop (which he claimed to have never done before), but luckily Motto was able to inform him before Ramsay saw it. However, Bret cooked two portions of halibut in a filthy pan and Trev overcooked one of the two lamb chops, earning the team a trip to the pantry. After the former served raw salmon to Smith's five-month-pregnant wife and Trev's wellington for Smith fell apart, an irate and embarrassed Ramsay kicked the men out. Elimination: The men were asked for one nominee, but Bret and Trev both blamed each other for the service's failure, so Ramsay called both of them down. He eliminated Trev for his third consecutive nomination, downward spiral over the past three services, refusal to take responsibility for his mistakes and failure to gain the respect of his teammates, much to the relief of Bret and Motto. Nonetheless, Ramsay praised him for his passion and dedication and wished him luck in his culinary career. Afterwards, he warned Bret to step up his game and asked the women for a volunteer to move to the red team the next day in order to even the numbers. Ramsay's comment: "Trevor is one of the most passionate chefs I've ever had in Hell's Kitchen. But, until he has the support of his brigade, he'll continue to be lost at sea."
278	12	"Break on Through"	January 18, 2019	HK-1812	2.64
Team Change: Ariel initially wanted to transfer, but ultimately let Mia do it to give the latter an opportunity to step up as a leader. This made her the third person in the show's history to switch back to their original team, after Autumn from season 7 and Trev from season 8. Immediately afterward, the chefs discovered their biggest challenge when portraits of this season's guest judges: Des Jardins, Lefevre, Blais, Chung and Gordon all shattered to reveal five black jackets behind them. Black Jacket Challenge 1: For their first challenge, each chef had to randomly select their ingredients: protein, two vegetables, starch and a wildcard. They then had 45 minutes to cook their dishes using the ingredients. Motto, Bret, Ariel and Mia all got good reviews. Kanae received praise for the flavors of her potato-crusted lamb but was criticized for plating raw green beans. Heather's pan-seared duck breast and purple sweet potato puree received the worst review, as she didn't let her duck (which she had never cooked before) rest long enough and her puree was gummy. Ariel's pan-seared scallops and Mia's filet mignon were deemed the best and won the first two black jackets and passes to the Black jacket lounge. Black Jacket Challenge 2: For their second challenge, the remaining four chefs had to spin a wheel to determine the four ingredients they would all need to use, which were quail, eggplant, baby leeks and cauliflower. Heather spun the quail, which distressed her due to her inexperience with it. They then were given another 45 minutes had to cook their own dish using those ingredients. Bret's Herbes de Provence chargrilled quail and Motto stuffed quail were the two best dishes, as Heather left a lemon wedge in her quail and also removed the wings and legs, while Kanae's cauliflower puree was of poor consistency. Bret and Motto won their black jackets and joined Ariel and Mia at the Black Jacket Lounge. Black Jacket Challenge 3: For the final challenge, Heather and Kanae had 45 minutes to make their own surf and turf dish. Heather burned her hand late in the challenge but managed to finish, presenting a filet mignon and lobster tail with broccoli rabe and mashed potatoes, while Kanae made an Asian-inspired pork chop and prawns with coconut cilantro rice. Elimination: After tasting both their dishes, Ramsay gave Heather the final black jacket, much to the disappointment of the other chefs, who felt that she had played it too safe in her dish, and eliminated Kanae due to her under seasoned rice and overly sweet prawns. Before Kanae left, Ramsay told her she would have a bright future in the culinary industry, hoping that one day she would become an executive chef. He gave no comment on her elimination and she did not receive the coat hanging and portrait burning sequence.
279	13	"An Episode of Firsts"	January 25, 2019	HK-1813	2.66
As the final five celebrated in the black jacket lounge, Bret revealed that having earned a black jacket meant a lot to him as he fell victim to his circumstances when he was younger, nearly facing a 30-year prison sentence. Individual Challenge: The next day, the final five received breakfast from the sous-chefs in the form of Ramsay's eggs Benedict, which Ariel and Mia took extra time to analyze. Their premonitions proved correct when Ramsay announced the Taste It, Now Make It Challenge, and gave the five 30 minutes to recreate the dish. Both Bret and Heather were disqualified for serving a broken hollandaise sauce. Motto, who chose not to taste Ramsay's sample plate, was also eliminated for being the only person to identify prosciutto but not Canadian bacon. Ariel and Mia each got one component of the hollandaise sauce correct (paprika and shallots, respectively), so Ramsay declared both of them winners. Reward/Punishment: Ariel and Mia went with the sous-chefs to iFly for an indoor skydiving experience and ate lunch at Sweet Butter. The other chefs had to clean the dorms. Service: Actors Kelli Berglund and Drew Van Acker were in attendance in addition to Los Angeles Rams players Rodger Saffold, Tyler Higbee, and Jared Goff. The chefs struggled with communication and timing all night. Ariel put in a strong performance on appetizers, but Heather fell behind on the fish station, requiring Motto's help, and gave conflicting times on her scallops, resulting in Motto bringing them up with Ariel two minutes away on her risotto. After that, the appetizers ran smoothly. On entrees, Bret served a raw New York strip and Ramsay scolded him for not communicating with Motto. The latter managed to get the refire accepted, but the order had to wait on Bret's sauce. Mia froze on garnish and did not respond when Bret asked for a time, while Heather stalled the kitchen on the Rams' table when the salmon skin broke off, requiring Motto to help her out again. After a communication breakdown caused Motto to get confused over how many fish were on order, Ramsay got the chefs back on track, and dinner service continued with no other problems. Despite completing service, Ramsay was not happy as they did not maintain their strong start and asked the final five to nominate two people for elimination. Elimination: Heather and Mia were nominated, even though the latter argued for Bret for having two steaks sent back. Ramsay polled the other three on who should leave; Motto and Ariel voted for Heather while Bret voted for Mia. Ramsay agreed and eliminated Heather for her serious downward spiral over the past several services, making excuses for her mistakes, and not showing the same strength she had back in Season 16. Heather was the last of the former runner-ups to be eliminated from the competition. Ramsay's comment: "Too many times, Heather blamed her mistakes on having a bad day. I'm not looking for apologies, I'm looking for an executive chef."
280	14	"What's Your Motto?"	February 1, 2019	HK-1814	3.08
Shortly before midnight, Ramsay called the black jackets down and introduced them to Dan Drake, founder of the pancake catering company Dancakes, who used pancakes to draw portraits of the four chefs as well as Ramsay. The latter announced the next challenge, which was to create an innovative dish to be prepared and served tableside for esteemed chefs visiting Hell's Kitchen. Individual Challenge: Guest judges included Ted Hopson, Geoff Baumberger, Michael Fiorelli and Joel Miller. Ariel made duck meatball (albondigas) dumplings served in a pozole soup, while the others made shrimp dishes inspired by their respective heritages (Italian, Puerto Rican and Cajun). Motto nearly dropped his pan for one table while telling them a story about a cookoff he was in. For another table, he worked so slowly that he was nearly unable to serve them in time. Mia forgot the name of the shrimp that she was using in her dish when prompted but charmed her guests with her Puerto Rican demeanor. Bret unsettled several guests by describing his many seafood-based tattoos. Ariel's desire to improve upon her performance in Season 6 elicited sympathy from her guests. In the end, Ariel won the challenge and chose Bret to join her on the reward, out of veteran solidarity and sympathy for the many punishments he faced. Reward/punishment: While Ariel and Bret enjoyed a day at the beach, horseback riding and a personal massage session in Malibu, Mia and Motto had to wash, peel, zest and juice citrus fruits at the bar to make sangrias for the upcoming dinner service. Dinner service: Model/actor Amber Rose, professional skateboarder Neen Williams and sports broadcaster Curt Menefee attended service. The final four took turns running the pass and had to be on the lookout for sabotages from Ramsay and the sous-chefs. Bret caught Christina making a carbonara with spaghetti instead of tagliatelle and rejected Ariel's undercooked scallops, but ironically missed orzo pasta being used in place of rice in his own risotto. Ariel noticed Jocky giving her tuna tartare instead of beef tartare and sent back Bret's scrambled carbonara, but couldn't taste the difference between fennel and onion puree. Mia spotted monkfish wellington instead of lobster but missed a ribeye in place of a New York strip and Bret's garlicky risotto. However, she recovered to reject Ariel's bland mashed potatoes as well as another one of Bret's cracked carbonaras. Motto noticed that Marino had given him a ticket with salmon tartare, which wasn't on the menu, and attempted to send back a pork chop for being undercooked, only for Ramsay to inform him that it was actually a veal chop. Ramsay was relatively pleased by the service and asked the four chefs to each nominate one person who they felt did not deserve to advance to the final. Motto's exit: Bret and Mia nominated each other, but Motto shocked everyone by nominating himself, as he felt his passion for food resided in the landscape of his hometown of Baton Rouge, Louisiana and he wanted to take the knowledge and skills gained throughout his time in the competition back with him. After he announced this decision at the elimination ceremony, Ramsay was disappointed, but he nonetheless praised his tenacity and sincerity, asked Motto to call him to discuss opportunities when he was finished, and allowed him to keep his jacket. He did not get a jacket hanging and picture burning scene, and Ramsay did not comment on his departure. Ramsay then announced Ariel as the first finalist, but before it was revealed whether Bret or Mia would be the second, the episode ended on a cliffhanger.
281	15	"A Rollercoaster Ride"	February 8, 2019	HK-1815	3.17
Continuing from the previous episode, Ramsay named Mia as the second finalist and eliminated Bret, but praised him for his unmatched passion, reminded him how proud of him his parents would have been, and allowed him to keep his jacket. He then assigned Ariel to sous-chef Christina and Mia to sous-chef Jocky, who would help them prepare a tasting menu consisting of one cold and hot appetizer and one seafood, chicken, and beef entree. The next morning, Ramsay brought in Ariel's and Mia's parents. He took the final two to brunch, where he announced that Six Flags Magic Mountain had been closed for the day, and they would be able to go on the rides with their parents all afternoon, including Viper. That evening, Ramsay and his daughter Holly joined them and told them there was one more roller coaster to go on, which he incorrectly stated had yet been opened to the public: Full Throttle. (Note: Full Throttle opened on June 22, 2013, whereas season 18 was filmed in 2017.) He led Mia and Ariel to it, where they were greeted by a live audience. Challenge: For the final challenge, Ariel and Mia were given 60 minutes to prepare their menus with the help of the sous-chefs. Ramsay brought in guest judges Mary Sue Milliken, Rick Moonen, Josiah Citrin, Hubert Keller and Michael Cimarusti for each course who would rate each dish on a scale from one to 10. Mia beat Ariel 9–8 on the cold appetizer and chicken entree, but Ariel did the same on the hot appetizer and seafood entree, which meant Cimarusti would break the tie on the steak entree. He gave Ariel 8 and Mia 9, which gave the latter the win and the first choice of the eight returning chefs from the season to form a brigade for the final dinner service. Mia picked Roe, Trev, Jose, and Heather. Ariel selected Kanae, Bret, Motto, and was left with Scotley. The chefs and the sous-chefs then all got on Full Throttle for one last ride before heading back to Hell's Kitchen.
282	16	"The Grand Finale"	February 8, 2019	HK-1816	3.17
In the season recap at the beginning of the episode, Chris, Kanae, and Motto each had their pictures burned. Pre-service: Ariel had no trouble getting her team to buy into her menu, but Roe, Heather and Trev had trouble pronouncing several of Mia's dishes' names and got annoyed with her micromanagement during prep. Heather in particular was not pleased to have to work for Mia. Ramsay liked Mia's menu but asked Ariel to re-season every one of her dishes. Dinner service: The finalists' families plus NFL player Matt Barkley, stuntwoman Jessie Graff and actor Yael Grobglas sat in the dining room for the final dinner service, while former prosecutor Marcia Clark and actor/comedian J. B. Smoove sat at Ariel's and Mia's chef's tables respectively. Both Mia and Ariel got through the appetizers smoothly. The former had to remind Trev to salt his risotto, and Kanae needed Motto's help after burning dumplings, but they all recovered. On entrees, Roe served raw pork and an overcooked sea bass, the latter of which forced Mia to refire an entire table. In the red kitchen, Scotley nearly burned his rib cap until Ariel reminded him to pay attention to his station. Bret bounced back after sending a cold steak, but when he served burnt, then raw chicken for the Six Flags executive staff six-top, Ramsay yelled at him to wake up. Despite the minor hiccups, both teams finished service on a strong note. Winner: As per Hell's Kitchen tradition, Mia and Ariel stood in front of two doors. Ariel's door opened, making her the eighteenth winner of Hell's Kitchen and the second winner in a row who was appearing on the show a second time. Mia took her defeat graciously. Having grown close to Mia through their positive competitive rivalry during the competition, Ariel promised to keep a job opening for her in Las Vegas if the opportunity arose, and hung her picture in the Hall of Fame. Ramsay's comment: "Since the first time she was here, Ariel has grown tenfold as a chef. She is fiercely talented, extremely determined, and a commanding leader. I could not be more pleased to have her as my executive chef of Hell's Kitchen in Las Vegas."
