= Millmont, Pennsylvania =

Unincorporated community in Pennsylvania, US

- Unincorporated community
- Location within Pennsylvania
- Coordinates: 40°53′09″N 77°08′27″W
- Country: United States
- State: Pennsylvania
- County: Union
- Elevation: 581 ft (177 m)
- Time zone: UTC-5 (Eastern (EST))
  - Summer (DST): UTC-4 (EDT)
- ZIP code: 17845
- Area codes: 272 & 570
- GNIS feature ID: 1181274

Millmont is an unincorporated community in Union County, Pennsylvania, United States. The community is 1.3 miles (2.1 km) southeast of Hartleton. Millmont has a post office with ZIP code 17845.
