= Hell's Kitchen (American TV series) season 16 =

Hell's Kitchen
- Season 16
- Promotional poster for season 16, featuring host Ramsay
- Hosted by: Gordon Ramsay
- No. of contestants: 18
- Winner: Kimberly-Ann Ryan
- Runner-up: Heather Williams
- No. of episodes: 16

Release
- Original network: Fox
- Original release: September 23, 2016 – February 2, 2017

Season chronology
- ← Previous; Season 15 Next → All Stars

The sixteenth season of the American competitive reality television series Hell's Kitchen premiered on Fox on September 23, 2016, and concluded on February 2, 2017. Gordon Ramsay returned as host and head chef, while Aaron Mitrano returned as the Blue Team's sous-chef, and Andi Van Willigan-Cutspec returned as the Red Team's sous-chef, replacing Christina Wilson, after the former had appeared as a guest in the previous season. Marino Monferrato returned as maître d'.

The season was won by event chef Kimberly-Ann Ryan, with sous-chef Heather Williams finishing second.

This season was filmed between November and December 2014, shortly after the completion of the previous season, about two years before airing.

This was the first season since season 13 to take a hiatus due to Fox's coverage of the 2016 World Series, in addition to the holiday breaks. The remaining episodes were moved to Thursday nights, starting on January 5, 2017, as part of the network's midseason schedule.

This is the first season to have episode titles other than the usual "(Remaining number of) Chefs Compete" and "Winner Chosen".

== Chefs ==
Eighteen chefs compete in season 16.

Contestant	Age (Note: Age at the time of filming)	Occupation	Hometown	Result
Kimberly-Ann Ryan	29	Event Chef	Traverse City, Michigan	Winner
Heather Williams (Note: Chef returned to Hell's Kitchen again in season 18 finished at 5th place.)	26	Sous Chef	Easton, Pennsylvania	Runner-Up
Heidi Parent	33	Executive Chef	Auburn, Maine	Eliminated before Finals
Paul "Paulie" Giganti, Jr.	34	Executive Chef	Brooklyn, New York	Eliminated after Thirteenth Service
Kimberly Roth	34	Sushi Chef	Ontario, New York	Eliminated after Thirteenth Service
Andrew Pearce	27	Sous Chef	Prospect Park, Pennsylvania	Eliminated after Black Jackets Challenge
Devin Simpson	33	Assistant Restaurant Manager	Mount Pleasant, South Carolina	Eliminated after Twelfth Service
Wendy Mendez	32	Line Cook/Pastry Chef	Bronx, New York	Eliminated after Eleventh Service
Matt Hearn	27	Sauté Chef	Los Angeles, California	Eliminated after Tenth Service
Shaina Hayden	28	Banquet Chef	Long Island, New York	Eliminated after Tenth Service
William "Koop" Wynkoop	28	Kitchen Manager	Carey, Ohio	Eliminated after Ninth Service
Johnny McDevitt	29	Burger Chef	Philadelphia, Pennsylvania	Eliminated after Eighth Service
Aziza Young	34	Kitchen Manager	Harrisburg, Pennsylvania	Eliminated after Sixth Service
Aaron Smock	22	Culinary Student	Frankenmuth, Michigan	Eliminated after Fifth Service
Rajeeyah "Gia" Young	31	Catering Chef	Queens, New York	Eliminated after Fourth Service
Jessica Boynton	32	University Chef	Raleigh, North Carolina	Eliminated after Third Service
Genaro Delillo	26	Sous Chef	Lebanon, Pennsylvania	Eliminated after Second Service
Pat Tortorello	47	Culinary Instructor	Belleville, New Jersey	Eliminated after First Service

== Contestant progress ==
No.	Chef	Original teams							1st switch		2nd switch				Individuals		Finals
No.	Chef	1601	1602	1603	1604	1605	1606	1607	1608	1609	1610	1611	1612	1613	1614	1615	1616
1	Ryan	WIN	WIN	LOSE	WIN	WIN	LOSE	LOSE	WIN	WIN	LOSE	LOSE	LOSE	IN	IN	IN	WINNER
2	Heather	WIN	WIN	LOSE	WIN	WIN	LOSE	LOSE	WIN	WIN	LOSE	WIN	WIN	IN	IN	IN	RUNNER-UP
3	Heidi	WIN	WIN	LOSE	WIN	WIN	LOSE	LOSE	WIN	WIN	LOSE	WIN	WIN	IN	IN	OUT	Ryan's team
4	Paulie	LOSE	LOSE	WIN	LOSE	LOSE	NOM	WIN	NOM	NOM	LOSE	NOM	LOSE	IN	OUT		Ryan's team
5	Kimberly	WIN	WIN	LOSE	WIN	WIN	LOSE	LOSE	WIN	WIN	NOM	WIN	WIN	IN	OUT		Heather's team
6	Andrew	LOSE	LOSE	WIN	LOSE	LOSE	LOSE	WIN	WIN	WIN	LOSE	WIN	WIN	OUT			Heather's team
7	Devin	LOSE	LOSE	WIN	LOSE	NOM	NOM	WIN	LOSE	LOSE	LOSE	LOSE	OUT				Heather's team
8	Wendy	WIN	WIN	LOSE	WIN	WIN	NOM	NOM	NOM	LOSE	NOM	OUT					Ryan's team
9	Matt	NOM	LOSE	WIN	LOSE	LOSE	LOSE	WIN	WIN	WIN	OUT						
10	Shaina	WIN	WIN	LOSE	WIN	WIN	LOSE	NOM	LOSE	LOSE	OUT						Heather's team
11	Koop	LOSE	LOSE	WIN	NOM	LOSE	LOSE	WIN	LOSE	OUT							Ryan's team
12	Johnny	LOSE	LOSE	WIN	LOSE	NOM	LOSE	WIN	OUT								
13	Aziza	WIN	WIN	LOSE	WIN	WIN	OUT										
14	Aaron	LOSE	NOM	WIN	NOM	OUT											
15	Gia	WIN	WIN	NOM	OUT												
16	Jessica	WIN	WIN	OUT													
17	Genaro	LOSE	OUT														
18	Pat	OUT															

Keywords

- WIN = Won the dinner service
- LOSE = Lost the dinner service
- BoB = Best of the Best, usually exempt from nomination
- BoW = Best of the Worst, sometimes exempt from nomination
- IN = not nominated for elimination
- NOM = nominated for elimination
- OUT = eliminated normally
- LEFT = withdrew from competition
- HOSP = eliminated due to hospitalization
- EJEC = eliminated during service

Color key
Chef was eliminated after regular nomination
Chef was eliminated after Ramsay's nomination
Chef was eliminated without nomination
Chef was eliminated from winning team
Chef was eliminated in the Cook For Your Life challenge
Chef was nominated to participate in the Cook For Your Life challenge
Chef was eliminated during service
Chef withdrew from the competition
Chef was the Best of the Best/Worst
Chef was retained after regular nomination
Chef was retained after Ramsay's nomination
Chef's nomination was voided
The winner of Hell's Kitchen
The runner-up of Hell's Kitchen

== Episodes ==
No. overall	No. in season	Title	Original release date	U.S. viewers (millions)
235	1	"When the Wall Comes Tumbling Down"	September 23, 2016	3.37
18 chefs were brought to the U.S. Army's training facility. Upon arriving, Ramsay popped out of a tank and explained that he needed to make sure they had the discipline needed to survive. The sergeants directed the chefs to get into their military uniforms and begin the obstacle course. Ramsay originally tasked them with climbing a wall, but the wall fell on top of him, with a paper section that ripped where he was standing, revealing Hell's Kitchen and a group of spectators, leading to the signature dish challenge. He later announced that the winner of this season would become the head chef of Yardbird Southern Table and Bar at the Venetian Hotel in Vegas. Team challenge/signature dish: The chefs had 45 minutes to cook their signature dish, rated from 1–5 by Ramsay. Notably good dishes included Ryan's seared scallops with Rice Krispies, Paulie's biscotti-encrusted scallops with polenta cake and Heather's pan-seared ribeye (5 points each). Notably poor dishes included Kimberly's pappardelle and clams, which featured boxed pasta and canned clams, Jessica's risotto, which Ramsay spat out and Matt's dove breast Bolognese (1 point each). In the last round, Johnny's steak and farro and Heidi's ricotta gnocchi each scored 4 points and the women won, 27–25. Reward/punishment: The women rode a Hummer limo to Takami in Downtown Los Angeles, where they enjoyed a special sushi dinner with Hell's Kitchen season 4 and 12 winners Christina Machamer and Scott Commings. The men cleaned the kitchens, prepped the dining room for opening night and transported the risers out of the building, under the direction of maître d' Marino. While Pat sat out of the punishment, Marino and the others made fun of Matt's signature dish, which cost the men the challenge. Dinner Service: Real Husbands of Hollywood star Erica Ash and actor Nolan Gould attended opening night. Ryan, Kimberly, Aaron and Koop served tableside linguine and clams. The women got off to a strong start on appetizers, while the men struggled as Pat deep-fried the risotto, then served an overly salty one, leading to Paulie taking over the appetizer station. Matt undercooked the scallops, blaming Andrew for pushing him to bring them up and suggesting that Ramsay check the camera footage to verify this, only for the latter to threaten to "stick a GoPro up" his backside if he made another excuse for badly cooked scallops. Ramsay kicked out Matt and Genaro for overcooking and undercooking the sea bass before warning the rest of the men that they would get thrown out if they made one more mistake. He followed through on his promise after Paulie, who moved to the fish station, undercooked the refire. The women finished a solid opening night service thanks to Jessica and Heather's strong performances on fish and meat respectively. Elimination: Though Paulie was willing to nominate himself, Johnny saved him and argued for Matt to go up for his disrespectful attitude towards Ramsay. Ultimately, the men nominated Pat and Matt. Even though the latter displayed a bad attitude during his plea, Ramsay sent him back in line and eliminated the former for performing poorly on the appetizer station and surrendering full control to Paulie. Ramsay's comment: "Pat is Italian and couldn't even cook risotto. What a meatball. Ciao, Pat."
236	2	"Crepe Grand Prix"	September 30, 2016	3.28
Team challenge: The teams were brought to a raceway, where they were greeted by Ramsay in a racecar. He revealed that they would be participating in the first-ever Crêpe Grand Prix. They were split into pairs and tasked with cooking chicken and mushroom-stuffed crêpes, which they would race to deliver to Ramsay via golf cart. The first team to deliver 10 perfect crêpes first would win. The women had an extra member, so Aziza, Jessica and Shaina worked together. They took an early, but the men quickly caught up. With the score tied at nine, Koop and Johnny won the challenge for the men after Jessica, Aziza and Shaina's last crêpe was rejected. Reward/punishment: The men sailed on a superyacht to Santa Barbara, where they ate lunch with Marino and went jet skiing. The women were forced to take in a delivery of Dover sole, snapper, lobster and sea bass, and break down, descale and fillet them for service. They were also served milkshakes consisting of raw scallops, fish guts and fisheyes for lunch, causing Wendy and Aziza to vomit, though the former took it harder than the latter did. Shaina received a real chocolate milkshake but did not tell her team out of fear of upsetting them until she confessed when asked by Ramsay before service, irritating Gia and Heidi. During the punishment, Jessica annoyed her teammates with her constant laughter. Dinner Service: Actors Noureen DeWulf and Dash Mihok were in attendance. Johnny, Paul, Heidi and Shaina served a special Dover sole appetizer tableside. In the women's kitchen, Jessica served a soupy carbonara and was confused on appetizers, but she quickly rebounded. Gia shocked Ramsay by asking about dessert even though the team was still on entrees. Kimberly undercooked the lamb but she recovered and the women got through the rest of service without further incidents. However, the men struggled. Aaron didn't communicate from the appetizer station and overdressed a kale salad and Andrew forgot an order of scallops, setting the team back. The former failed to roll his pizzas properly, then attempted to cook two pizzas on the same paddle. After Genaro undercooked the New York strip twice, an angry Ramsay kicked the men out, demanding two nominations before asking the women to finish their service. Elimination: The men nominated Aaron and Genaro. While the former was called out for his inexperience, Ramsay told him to "wake up" and eliminated the latter for his lack of passion and second consecutive poor service performance. Ramsay's comment: "When a chef shows me he has no passion, I show him the door. Goodbye, Genaro."
237	3	"The Yolks on Them"	October 7, 2016	3.13
Team challenge: The teams entered the dining room to see Ramsay surrounded by dozens of ostrich eggs, only to be told that they would be working with ostrich meat instead. They were given four minutes to crack open eggs, which would determine their ingredients, then 40 minutes to prepare their dishes. Each team made two dishes featuring each cut of meat; since the women had an extra member, Heather, Heidi and Kimberly each cooked with top loin, and Johnny made two ground meat dishes. David McMillan and Frédéric Morin, the chef/owners of Joe Beef in Montreal, were the guest judges. In the last round, the women scored on pearl and they won the challenge 3–1. Reward/punishment: The women flew in private jets to Big Bear for a ziplining adventure. The men were forced to clean up the mess in the dining room and take in a delivery of raw pine nuts; they had to open the pinecones and remove the nuts, which would be used to make a pesto for service. During the punishment, Matt angrily sulked in the dorms, even lashing out at Aaron and threatening to quit the competition. After hearing about his outburst, Ramsay called him into his office for a pep talk and Matt decided to stay, though he was met with backlash from his teammates for not pulling his weight. During prep the next day, Gia irritated her teammates by standing around and doing nothing. Dinner Service: Andrew and Jessica served rock shrimp pesto tagliatelle tableside. The men stumbled early; Koop made too many portions of risotto, which were perfectly cooked, but he rebounded. Paulie overcooked the scallops, then burned the refires, much to Ramsay's anger. Recovering from his earlier meltdown, Matt stepped up and helped Paulie deliver acceptable scallops. On entrees, Aaron burned a pot of mashed potatoes, but the men regrouped and successfully completed their first dinner service. In the women's kitchen, Kimberly overcooked the scallops but recovered. On the meat station, Gia served an overcooked lamb chop, even though her first one was perfectly cooked, and poorly sliced the Wellingtons, which she blamed on a finger injury. However, the injury was hardly noticeable. Marino returned Jessica's overcooked tagliatelle from the dining room while she attempted to start over. However, Ramsay called her back into the kitchen and showed the women Kimberly's raw salmon and Gia's raw Wellingtons, before kicking them out. Elimination: The women unanimously agreed to nominate Gia, but Jessica nominated herself, even though the team had a strong case against Kimberly. Despite performing horrendously during service, Gia revealed that Jessica had packed her bags prior to the elimination. Ramsay then sent the former back in line and eliminated the latter for giving up and failing to demonstrate the confidence and fightback needed to become a head chef, making her the first contestant in Hell's Kitchen history to be eliminated after a service where they were on tableside. Ramsay's comment: "A chef who can't handle confrontation is like a boxer who doesn't want to get hit. Jessica just threw in the towel."
238	4	"Surf Riding & Turf Fighting"	October 14, 2016	3.38
Team challenge: Ramsay brought back the protein identification challenge; each team was split into pairs and raced to identify the proteins used in four surf and turf dishes. The light would turn green if both guesses were correct, yellow if one was incorrect, and red if both were incorrect. The team that correctly identified all of the proteins the fastest would win. The men decided to pair chefs with stronger palates with those with weaker ones, thereby ensuring that there was at least one chef with a good palate in each pair; Paulie went twice as they were short one member. The women took a slightly different track, with Heidi and Ryan pairing up due to their friendship, despite Shaina suggesting that the team pair up the way the men did. The women ended up taking 13 minutes and 41 seconds, mainly due to Shaina and Aziza constantly making random guesses. The men finished with three minutes and 55 seconds remaining and they won the challenge. Reward/punishment: The men went surfing at the Wave House in San Diego. The women were forced to make sausages from scratch and had a bizarre platter consisting of unappetizing items, such as pig feet and tarantulas, for lunch. Before the punishment, Shaina argued with Ryan about pairing up with Heidi instead of someone with a weak palate. The latter insisted the reason the team lost was a lack of hustle. In a deleted scene from this episode, despite being included in the opening video in the first episode, Wendy cut her fingernails after she stuck her hand in the grinder, unaware that Heidi was running it. This accident required her to receive urgent care. Dinner Service: Ramsay raised the stakes when he announced that each team would be working half of a 12-top table, consisting of several pregnant women. Actor Pooch Hall also attended service. Wendy and Devin served a special tableside appetizer of mussels and sausage. In the women's kitchen, Aziza deep-fried the scallops but quickly recovered. The women completed the entrees for their half of the 12-top before the men, but were delayed by Gia, who sent up overcooked green beans while forgetting one portion and then talked back to Ramsay; Ryan jumped on the garnish station to assist her. Nonetheless, they managed to finish service. Meanwhile, Koop undercooked the lobster but recovered. Aaron's teammates grew frustrated with him for not communicating, even though his proteins were cooked perfectly. The men nearly finished service but on the last ticket, Aaron and Koop undercooked the wellington and overcooked the sea bass, and Ramsay kicked the entire team out of the kitchen for the third time this season and asked for two nominees. Elimination: The men nominated Koop and Aaron. However, Ramsay spared them both and eliminated Gia for having a bad attitude, performing poorly in two consecutive services and losing the faith of her team, making her the seventh chef to be eliminated despite being on the winning team. Ramsay's comment: "I gave Gia a second chance, which proved to be two chances too many. See ya, Gia."
239	5	"Walking the Plank"	October 21, 2016	3.38
Team challenge: The teams entered the dining room and were greeted with a performance from a group of singing sailors. Ramsay then introduced the Seven Seas Seafood Challenge; certain chefs picked a member from the opposing team, who then selected a scroll bearing the name of one of seven fish: bluefin tuna, branzino, grouper, wahoo, cod, Arctic char and sea bass. The chefs were then given 30 minutes to cook their fish. In the last round, Andrew, who was initially concerned that his fish was undercooked, scored over Wendy on sea bass and the men won, 5–4. Reward/punishment: The men ate lunch with Ramsay at Petty Cash and went bowling at Pinz in Studio City. The women broke down and diced up a large delivery of vegetables for a tableside seafood chowder, then prepped both kitchens. They were already fed up with Kimberly for losing the challenge, but she made things worse by asking a lot of pointless questions, irritating her teammates. Dinner Service: Aerosmith guitarist Joe Perry and Grammy-winning artist Estelle dined at the men's and women's chef's tables. Matt and Heather served clam chowder tableside. Aziza and Paulie each led their respective teams well on appetizers, but Devin served cold asparagus while Johnny undercooked the salmon. Ryan and Heidi had control of the meat and fish stations respectively, Kimberly performed well on garnish and the women finished another perfect service, although Ryan was warned to speak up. The men, on the other hand, sunk as Andrew undercooked the New York strip twice, Johnny burned the salmon twice and Devin served bland spinach, causing Ramsay to kick them out and ask for two nominees yet again. Elimination: The men nominated Devin and Aaron even though the latter had a good performance. Ramsay asked for one more nominee but refused to say that chef's name and wanted him to step forward; Johnny voluntarily stepped forward. He sent Devin and Johnny back in line and eliminated Aaron for his lack of confidence, inexperience and failure to gain his team's respect, but praised him for his passion and skill. Ramsay's comment: "To be a great chef, you have to earn respect from your brigade. Being so young and inexperienced, Aaron was never gonna do that with his team, and that's why I took his jacket."
240	6	"Let the Catfights Begin"	November 4, 2016	3.38
Team challenge: The teams were brought to the Hell's Kitchen library, where they played a game similar to Scrabble; the chefs were each given five minutes to spell out as many ingredients as possible by placing books containing letters on a cross board, then 45 minutes to make an entree using any of the ingredients spelled out. Since the women had an extra member, they dropped Aziza's chicken dish because the chicken was raw. Ramsay scored each dish on a scale of 1–5. The men won their third consecutive challenge, 17–16. Reward/punishment: The men rode bumper cars at a local ice rink and had dinner at a local steakhouse. The women inflated balloons, prepped the dining room and baked cookies for family night. They also had to organize a box of crayons, which Marino spilled on the floor. Shaina did very little during the punishment, irritating her teammates. Dinner Service: Guests in attendance for family night were actresses Lauren Lapkus and Ciara Hanna, current and former WWE wrestlers, including The Miz and Alicia Fox who were uncredited, as well as actress Kira Kosarin. Kimberly and Andrew ran the quesadilla stations in the dining room. Both teams had rocky services. In the women's kitchen, Shaina sent up a raw pizza despite being warned by Heidi, Aziza cooked too much garnish ahead of order, and Wendy and Heather undercooked the lamb and salmon respectively. Devin served a grilled cheese sandwich with dry bread and un-melted cheese. Paulie undercooked the burger, earning the men a trip to the pantry; he later undercooked the sea bass and Johnny sent up a raw egg. For the most part, both teams managed to bounce back from their various mistakes and complete service without any ejections, but they were declared losers due to those mistakes and told to come up with two nominees each. Elimination: The women nominated Aziza and Wendy while and the men nominated Paulie and Devin. Ramsay sent Devin and Wendy back in line and eliminated Aziza for being the worst performer of the night but praised her for her big heart and tenacity. He then warned the remaining chefs that if they gave him another poor service, more than one could be eliminated. Ramsay's comment: "Aziza has four kids at home. I think they need her more than I do. Unless, of course, they're hungry."
241	7	"Don't Tell My Fiance"	November 11, 2016	3.30
Team challenge: The teams were greeted in the dining room with a demonstration from three professional artists and Marino, who each created a painting of Ramsay. One chef from each team stood in front of a dome containing the name of a Southern dish. They then had 30 minutes to cook their dishes. Koop sliced his fingers during the challenge and started to feel nauseous while he was being treated by the medic. Because of this, he was unable to complete his dish. Executive chef Chris Hastings from Birmingham, Alabama was the guest judge. The women won 3–2, and Wendy's spicy fried catfish was deemed the best dish and featured on the menu for service. Reward/punishment: The women went horseback riding and enjoyed a Southern lunch prepared by the food truck Wings N' Waffles. The men were forced to grind thousands of pieces of corn and shell, devein and clean hundreds of shrimp for a shrimp and grits appetizer; they also had to prep both kitchens. Koop contemplated quitting after his injury but changed his mind. Dinner Service: Los Angeles Clipper player JJ Redick and The Real Housewives of Beverly Hills star Adrienne Maloof dined at the men's and women's chef's tables respectively, while recording artist Blake Lewis and actress Mircea Monroe sat in the dining room. Devin and Ryan served tableside shrimp and grits. The men had a solid performance, their only problems being Andrew serving soggy catfish and Koop undercooking the Wellington. The women had a rocky service; despite Kimberly's strong performance on appetizers, Shaina struggled on meat, overcooking and then undercooking the chicken for Maloof, while Wendy struggled with her own catfish dish. After Shaina sent up raw and overcooked Wellingtons and Wendy undercooked the catfish twice, Ramsay kicked the women out. Team change: The women nominated Shaina and Wendy. Ramsay called Wendy and then Shaina, transferring them to the blue team and moving Andrew and Matt to the red team. Ramsay's comment: "In Vegas, shuffling the deck gives a gambler a new chance for a better hand. I'm hoping this switch doesn't end up being a bust."
242	8	"Dancing with the Chefs"	November 18, 2016	3.14
Team challenge: Ramsay announced that the next service would be the first-ever Hell's Kitchen International Ballroom Invitational. The teams had 40 minutes to prepare an international-themed menu consisting of two chicken, two beef and two fish entrees. Dancers Jonathan Roberts and Michelle Johnston were the guest judges. The blue team scored on chicken but the red team scored on beef and fish, winning the challenge 2–1. Reward/punishment: The Red Team went kayaking in Santa Barbara and enjoyed a seafood dinner at The Lark. The blue team prepped the raw bar by hand-washing the oysters and clams and breaking down the lobsters. Dinner Service: The red team had a near-perfect service, their only error being Matt burning the scallops. The blue team's service was very rocky; Wendy forgot to cook the carbonara and Paulie cooked too many portions risotto too early. Things got worse on entrees as Johnny failed to sear the sea bass despite Shaina asking if he should, with the former not taking the latter's advice prior to service and also undercooked the bass and Devin undercooked the chicken while forgetting a portion. With the blue team 10 tables behind, including the judge's table, Ramsay lost his patience, kicked the blue team out of the kitchen for the fifth time this season and sent the red team, except Heather who was on desserts, to finish their service for them. Elimination: The Blue Team could not decide between Johnny, Paulie and Wendy, so Ramsay nominated all three without asking for an explanation, the first such occurrence since season 6. He eliminated Johnny for putting in another disastrous performance on fish, refusing to take responsibility for his mistakes and being the main reason for the blue team's defeat. Ramsay's comment: "Johnny's a burger chef from Philly. Unfortunately, for him, the two words he'll never hear from me are 'well done.'"
243	9	"Spoon Fed"	December 9, 2016	3.31
Team challenge: In the annual Blind Taste Test, the chefs had to correctly identify ingredients infused into baby food. While one chef tasted the ingredients, one teammate sat on a highchair in front of a spoon catapult that would splatter them with pureed baby food once for three incorrect guesses and twice for four. Wendy went twice due to the blue team being one chef down. She scored a perfect 4, becoming the third person to do so after Justin (season 10) and Milly (season 14) while Heidi scored 2. Devin scored 1, resulting in Wendy being splattered once, while Kimberly scored 3. Koop scored 2 while Ryan scored 1, resulting in Kimberly getting splattered. Paulie scored 3 and Matt scored 2. Heather scored 3 while Shaina scored 2. In the final round, Andrew scored 2 while Wendy scored 1 (resulting in Shaina getting splattered once). With the score tied at 13, the challenge went into sudden death. After Wendy and Andrew both missed cabbage, resulting in Shaina and Heather getting splattered respectively, Wendy won it for the blue team by identifying turnips. Reward/punishment: The blue team was rewarded with a spa day and lunch at a penthouse suite in the InterContinental Los Angeles Hotel. The red team took in deliveries of ice and wine and prepped both kitchens. They did not read the invoice and unloaded 102 bags of ice instead of 52, forcing them to take back the extra ice, angering Heidi. The team accused Matt of not reading the invoice. Dinner Service: Actor Josh McDermitt and TV personality Jeannie Mai attended this service. The red team, once again, seemingly had a near-perfect service, although Ramsay later told them it was "far from perfect". The only problem was Matt forgetting a portion of lamb, but he recovered. The blue team had a flawless performance on appetizers thanks to Devin and Shaina but struggled on entrées. Paulie undercooked the lamb and Koop was caught cooking salmon and sea bass in the same pan and argued with him over cooking times. After Paulie undercooked the lamb again, Ramsay lost his temper and threw the blue team out yet again for the sixth time this season, a series record, while telling them to eat their mistakes. When the team returned to the dorms, Koop lost his temper and threw a chair at a wall, breaking it. Elimination: The blue team nominated Koop and Paulie. The team stated that one of the reasons for Paulie's nomination was due to his serving raw lamb and cold Wellingtons, which was not shown during the episode. Upon learning about Koop's earlier temper tantrum, Ramsay sent the former back in line and eliminated the latter for his inconsistent performances, feeling that he was not backing up his talk, much to Devin and Wendy's dismay. After dismissing the blue team, he asked the red team to decide by the next morning on one member to join the blue team. Ramsay's comment: "Like many chefs, Koop can talk the talk. But after witnessing his cooking, I told him to walk the walk."
244	10	"Dancing in the Grotto"	December 16, 2016	3.31
Team change: The next morning, the red team chose Ryan to join the blue team. Team challenge: The teams were presented with an array of burgers and sliders. Outside Hell's Kitchen, they collected their ingredients by sliding into a ball pit and picking red and blue balls. The guest judges were Umami Burger founder Adam Fleischman, Father's Office chef/owner Sang Yoon and Gordon Ramsay BurGR executive chef and season 10 winner Christina Wilson. The challenge ended in a tie, 3–3, so the judges used the best slider overall; they gave the win to Heidi and the red team. Reward/punishment: The red team rode in a limo to the Playboy Mansion, where they were welcomed by 2009 Playmate of the Month Crystal Hefner and the Playboy Bunnies; they also got to hang out in the mansion's famous grotto. The blue team was forced to clean the LA River. Dinner Service: TV producers Melissa Rivers and Drew Scott dined in the blue kitchen, while Drew's twin brother Jonathan Scott and actress Ashley Greene dined in the red. Hefner sat in the dining room. The red team started off poorly with Matt overcooking the lobster for the chef's table and giving Ramsay an attitude, who then sent the team to the storeroom where Matt angrily argued with Heather. Heidi delivered a bland risotto that had been sitting on the stove for a while, causing Ramsay to warn that he would kick them out if one more mistake was made. He followed through on his promise after Kimberly served dry garnish on the first table of entrees. In the blue kitchen, Ryan served cold crab cakes but quickly recovered. On entrees Shaina sent up watery garnish and Wendy struggled to communicate, undercooking the chicken for the chef's table. However, it was her overcooked New York strip that caused Ramsay to throw the blue team out yet again as well. Elimination: The Red Team nominated Matt and Kimberly and the Blue Team nominated Wendy and Shaina. Ramsay eliminated Shaina for her worsening performances despite a strong start but praised her for her heart, passion and cooking ability. He then sent Kimberly and Wendy back in line and eliminated Matt for his arrogance, poor performance on fish, refusal to admit his mistakes and horrendous attitude, as well as his severe downward spiral since being moved to the red team. This marked the second time in Hell's Kitchen since season 11 that two chefs were sent home on the same night as a result of the traditional elimination process. Ramsay's comment: "Both kitchens performed horrendously tonight. I'm hoping that by eliminating Matt and Shaina, both teams will finally have a chance at success."
245	11	"Aerial Maneuvers"	January 5, 2017	3.66
Team challenge: The teams were greeted with a performance from two stunt artists in the dining room. They then faced the Taste it, Now Make it challenge. They were split into pairs and had 30 minutes to recreate one of Ramsay's signature dishes. However, there was a twist: while one chef tasted the dish, the other had to make it. Andrew and Heather were the only pair to correctly identify the greens as Swiss chard, but they also mistook apricot puree for persimmon. Ryan and Wendy won for the blue team by correctly identify the protein as veal; everyone else used pork. Reward/punishment: The blue team took trapeze lessons at the Santa Monica Pier. However, Wendy did not participate in the reward due to her fear of heights. In addition, Ryan and Wendy were rewarded their very own Vitamix blenders. The red team decorated the dining room for service. Dinner Service: Hell's Kitchen hosted a private dinner service for contributors to Stand Up to Cancer, including actors Jacqueline Toboni, Marg Helgenberger, Danielle Campbell, Omar J. Dorsey and cofounder Pamela Williams. Each chef took charge of one course, cooking 12 portions. On the lobster risotto course, Wendy sent up four inconsistently cooked portions and Kimberly plated portions of different sizes, but both recovered. Both Devin and Andrew led the scallops course without incident though Paulie tried to fire his course early. On the salmon course, Paulie took Wendy's potatoes before she could add the capers, which caused a delay, while Ramsay called for Heidi to be more vocal. Both Heather and Ryan led the New York strip course well and did not face problems apart from Devin cutting his hand while slicing the meat. The red team won due to the blue team committing more mental errors. Elimination: The blue team nominated Wendy and Paulie. Ramsay eliminated Wendy for her lack of confidence and her serious downward spiral since moving to the blue team but praised her for her palate and determination. Ramsay's comment: "First, Wendy told me her capers took a walk, then it was the potatoes, but after watching her lack of consistency and confidence, I knew it was her turn to take a walk."
246	12	"Fusion Confusion"	January 5, 2017	3.49
Team challenge: The teams were greeted in the dining room with a Hawaiian dance performance. In the fusion cuisine challenge, one chef from each team spun wheels to determine which country they would be working with. Heather and Ryan got Japanese and French (two cuisines Ryan did not want), while Kimberly and Devin got French and Chinese, and Paulie landed on Mexican while Andrew landed on the special "Chef's Choice", which he used to select Indian. Since the red team had an extra member, Heidi picked Ryan and Heather's combination. Ramsay brought in James Beard Award-winning chef Roy Yamaguchi as a guest judge. Neither Paulie nor Andrew scored on Mexican-Indian, while Ryan beat both Heidi and Heather on Japanese-French despite Paulie's skepticism, her unfamiliarity with this combination and her fears that her lamb was undercooked. Kimberly beat Devin on French-Chinese to force a 1–1 tie, but Yamaguchi chose Ryan's dish as the best, giving the blue team the win. Reward/punishment: The blue team was rewarded with a $2,000 kitchenware shopping spree at Surfas, followed by a seven-course lunch at Providence. The red team broke down a massive side of beef and prepped potatoes to make potato gratin for the next service. Dinner Service: Actors Kellita Smith, Jasika Nicole, Patrick Renna and Tommy Savas were in attendance. Smith's table returned a kale salad for having a hair in it, while Kimberly was criticized for not having her salmon ready before Heidi's veal, but the red team completed service without further problems. For the blue team, however, things were much rockier. On appetizers, Ryan misheard an order of risotto and accidentally threw out a serving. On entrees, Devin undercooked the veal chops while Paulie overcooked his sea bass, causing Ramsay to berate both of them. The former then forgot an order, though quickly recovered. The latter later ran out of bass and was forced to retrieve some from the red kitchen. The red team was praised for another solid dinner service while the blue team was asked for one nomination. Elimination: The blue team nominated Devin, who wanted Ryan to go up. After each chef gave their plea, Paulie was told to say goodbye to Devin, whom Ramsay eliminated for his inconsistent performance across all services and challenges but praised for his passion and big heart. Ramsay's comment: "Devin had a hard time remembering the tickets. Unfortunately, his performance tonight would be hard to forget."
247	13	"Black Jacket Lounge"	January 12, 2017	3.97
The chefs received a surprise visit from their loved ones before Ramsay announced a grueling three-part challenge that would determine who would earn a black jacket. Black Jacket Challenge 1: In the adaptability challenge, the chefs were presented with five domes: protein, starch, garnish, vegetable and marinade. Each time the bell was rung, they had to race to grab an ingredient from the dome, which they were required to use in their dish. Kimberly, Paulie, Andrew and Ryan all received praise for cooking their proteins perfectly, but Andrew mistook couscous for polenta and then boiled it, making it soggy, and Ryan ruined the quinoa for her hangar steak. Heather's French chicken breast with rice and Heidi's duck breast with sweet potato puree were deemed the best, winning the first two black jackets and passes to the black jacket lounge. Black Jacket Challenge 2: The remaining chefs had 30 minutes to make a dish using the following ingredients in a locked briefcase: cauliflower, cherry tomatoes, shiitake mushrooms, white beans, baby eggplant and salmon. Ryan and Paulie came out on top after Kimberly ruined her puree by putting eggplant in it and Andrew undercooked his eggplant. Black Jacket Challenge 3: Kimberly and Andrew had three minutes to shop at a farmer's market outside Hell's Kitchen, then 30 minutes to prepare two portions of a dish of their choice. Andrew cooked a New York strip with wild mushroom and crab bordelaise and potato puree, while Kimberly made a pan-seared filet with a variety of mushrooms and red wine demi-glace. After tasting both dishes, Ramsay revealed he would not decide which chef would receive the final black jacket. He instead tested their peers by having the black jackets individually taste each dish, without knowing who made what. Elimination: In the dining room, Ramsay finally revealed who cooked which dish. Ironically, Andrew's closest allies, Heather and Paulie, voted for Kimberly's filet, while Heidi and Ryan voted for Andrew's New York strip, resulting in a tie. Ramsay broke the tie in Kimberly's favor, eliminating Andrew due to the gloopy texture of his potato puree, but encouraged him to continue his career. Ramsay's comment: "Andrew had three chances to save his life in Hell's Kitchen. Like they say, three strikes and you're out."
248	14	"Playing Your Cards Right"	January 19, 2017	3.92
When the final five went to the black jacket lounge, Heidi comforted Paulie, who was upset his closest ally had been eliminated in part due to his vote, though the latter was in no mood for it. Individual Challenge: The final five played a game of poker. Each of them were given three ingredients in the form of playing cards: chicken, potatoes and smoked bacon, which they had to use in their dish. They then raced each other, collecting three additional ingredients by hitting the buzzer in front of them. Heidi was the last chef to not yet have three, so Ramsay handed her the last card, which revealed lemons. Executive chef Jenn Louis judged the dishes king of the hill style. Kimberly's pan-seared chicken with Dijon crust impressed, but Paulie's pecan-crusted chicken breast dethroned her and beat out Heidi's bone-in chicken with mashed potato and carrot-tarragon purees and Ryan's breadcrumb-crusted chicken. Ultimately, Heather's egg and pecorino-crusted chicken breast with potatoes and peas dethroned Paulie, winning her the challenge. Reward/punishment: Heather spent the night in the Presidential Suite at the Venetian and chose Heidi to join her. The other chefs participated in recycling day. Dinner Service: The black jackets each took a turn at running the pass while sous-chefs Andi and Aaron dined at the chef's table. SportsCenter anchor Neil Everett, podcaster Pauly Shore and actor Erik Griffin sat in the dining room. The service was very rocky; on appetizers, Kimberly undercooked the risotto but quickly recovered. During her turn at the pass, she plated the risottos in a bowl instead of a plate while Paulie overcooked the scallops and undercooked the lobster tails. After Heather interrupted him, Ramsay pulled the team into the storeroom and had sous-chef Andi cook the refired scallops. Paulie called out the wrong order while running the pass and then plated Heather's overcooked scallops; the latter also sent up raw sea bass. Kimberly incorrectly repeated a ticket and started panicking, and was threatened with elimination on the spot. After Paulie undercooked the pancetta, a frustrated Ramsay kicked the team out, forcing sous-chefs Andi and Aaron to finish service and leaving Heidi the only chef not to have a chance at being sous-chef. Elimination: The black jackets nominated Kimberly and Paulie. Kimberly admitted that this service had been rough for her, but felt like she had been improving as a chef and asked for another chance. Paulie, meanwhile, blamed his nomination on the fact that he was the only man left in the competition. Ramsay eliminated the former for her poor performance as a sous-chef and lack of composure on the appetizer station, but praised her improvement throughout the competition. He then eliminated the latter for his arrogance, inconsistent performances and refusal to take responsibility for any of his mistakes, though he praised his determination in the face of adversity. This marked the third-ever all-female final three (and the third in a row). Ramsay gave no comment on Kimberly and Paulie's eliminations. The final three immediately found out that their next challenge was beginning at the exact moment as the episode ended in a cliffhanger.
249	15	"Tequila Shots?"	January 26, 2017	3.98
In the recap of the previous episode, Kimberly and Paulie's jackets were hung and their photos burned. Individual Challenge: The final three were sent to Whole Foods Market, where they were given 15 minutes to shop for the ingredients needed to create a tableside entree, for esteemed judges visiting Hell's Kitchen, including Steve Samson, Mette Williams, Alessio Biangini and Bruce Kalman. Ryan's pan-seared scallops with mango salsa and tomatillo puree won by a landslide vote of 62.5%. Reward/punishment: Ryan went on a helicopter tour of Los Angeles with sous-chef Andi and had lunch with Ramsay at Firefly. Heather and Heidi wrapped gifts for the waitstaff and steamed their uniforms and polished their shoes. Dinner Service: Sharknado star Tara Reid was seated at the chef's table, while professional baseball player Adrián González, actor Matt Letscher and TV host/personality Taylor-Ann Hasselhoff also attended service. The final three took turns at running the pass and had to be on the lookout for sabotages from Ramsay and the sous-chefs. Heidi began first at the hot plate, mistaking edamame for peas in the carbonara, but catching carrot puree in the risotto instead of butternut squash puree. However, Heather stalled the kitchen with unseared scallops and a broken scallop. At the pass, she mistook Arctic char for salmon and also did not notice Marino giving her a ticket for a snapper (which was not on the menu), but overall performed well. Ryan ran the pass last, during which Heidi undercooked the risotto and took too long to deliver the refire. Although Ryan had difficulty reading two two-top tickets together and was fooled by black garlic puree as opposed to black bean puree, she successfully caught sous-chef Aaron sending celery mash instead of potato puree. Elimination: During the elimination, both Ryan and Heidi decided that Heather did not belong in the finale, with a lack of experience and inconsistent performances being their respective reasons. Heather nominated Ryan due to her lack of strong communication. Ramsay revealed the finalists as Heather and Ryan, eliminating Heidi. However, he praised her for her strength in the competition, and allowed her to keep her jacket, but still gave her the picture burning elimination sequence. Ramsay's comment: "Heidi is a very talented chef with a bright future, but it will not be at Yardbird in Las Vegas."
250	16	"Leaving It on the Line"	February 2, 2017	3.67
After delivering breakfast to the finalists, the sous-chefs worked with them to create their menus. Sous-chef Andi also surprised Ryan and Heather with a makeover at Ken Paves Salon followed by a VIP appearance at the Saban Theatre. And what was thought to be a new musical starring Rob Morrow, who welcomed Ramsay, Heather and Ryan backstage turned out to be the finalists' final challenge which was held in front of a live audience. Challenge: For their final challenge, Heather and Ryan were each given one hour to prepare their menus, consisting of a hot appetizer and a seafood, beef and chicken entree. Ramsay brought in guest judges Walter Manzke, Michael Cimarusti, Susan Feniger and Yardbird CEO/founder John Kunkel. Before the judging began, he explained that for every round, the winner would immediately get to draft one of eight prior eliminated chefs to form a brigade for the final service. (Note: Matt did not return since he had threatened Ramsay in his exit interview, so Koop took his place as the last chef eliminated prior to the top ten.) Heather won on the appetizer and selected Andrew, which did not surprise him, much to Ryan's disgust. The latter won on fish and picked Heidi. The former then won on chicken and beef and chose Kimberly and Shaina. Ryan picked Paulie and Heather lastly selected Devin, leaving Ryan with Koop and Wendy. Dinner Service: It was a star-studded final dinner service that featured several notable guests in attendance, including MLB player C. J. Wilson and actors Andrea Roth, Danny Trejo and Naomi Grossman, as well as the finalists' families. Heather's kitchen started out strong on appetizers despite her accidentally calling out two tables at once, causing Devin to forget the order and Andrew to bring up his scallops too early. In Ryan's kitchen, Paulie was very bitter about having to work for her despite having no material incentive to perform well and thus gave her little respect and mouthed off to her. He sent up cold meatballs, but she forced him back in line and Ramsay accused him of sabotaging her. On entrees, Heather's leadership began to fall apart, being sent overcooked ribeye from Kimberly, under-seasoned asparagus from Andrew and raw bass from Shaina, forcing Ramsay to give her a pep talk. When Kimberly's refire was late and undercooked, Heather made the difficult decision to send the table incomplete, but regained control of her team afterwards. Another undercooked steak forced Heather to move Devin to the meat station and Kimberly to desserts. In Ryan's kitchen, Wendy undercooked the salmon twice, forcing the former to switch the latter to meat in exchange for Koop. Both services ended on a positive note. Winner: As per Hell's Kitchen tradition, Ryan and Heather stood in front of a pair of doors in Ramsay's office. Ryan's door opened, making her the 16th winner; Heather took her defeat graciously. Ryan gave a victory speech and hung her picture in the Hall of Fame. Ramsay's comment: "Early on, I challenged Ryan to find her voice. Once she proved to me that she could command a kitchen, there was no stopping her. She has the tenacity, drive, and skill that will make her a great head chef at Yardbird Southern Table and Bar at the Venetian Las Vegas."

== Ratings ==
=== U.S. Nielsen ratings ===
No.	Episode	Air date	Timeslot (ET)	Rating/Share (18–49)		Viewers (millions)	Nightly rank	DVR 18–49	DVR viewers (millions)	Total (18–49)	Total viewers (millions)
1	"When the Wall Comes Tumbling Down"	September 23, 2016	Friday 8:00 p.m.	1.1	5	3.37	4	—N/a	1.49	—N/a	4.85
2	"Crepe Grand Prix"	September 30, 2016	Friday 8:00 p.m.	1.0	4	3.28	6	0.6	TBA	1.6	TBA
3	"The Yolks on Them"	October 7, 2016	Friday 8:00 p.m.	1.0	4	3.13	4	—N/a	1.34	—N/a	4.44
4	"Surf Riding & Turf Riding"	October 14, 2016	Friday 8:00 p.m.	1.0	4	3.38	4	—N/a	—N/a	—N/a	—N/a
5	"Walking the Plank"	October 21, 2016	Friday 8:00 p.m.	1.1	5	3.38	3	—N/a	—N/a	—N/a	—N/a
6	"Let the Catfights Begin"	November 4, 2016	Friday 8:00 p.m.	1.1	5	3.38	3	—N/a	—N/a	—N/a	—N/a
7	"Don't Tell My Fiance"	November 11, 2016	Friday 8:00 p.m.	1.1	4	3.30	4	TBA	TBA	TBA	TBA
8	"Dancing with the Chefs"	November 18, 2016	Friday 8:00 p.m.	1.0	4	3.14	4	TBA	TBA	TBA	TBA
9	"Spoon Fed"	December 9, 2016	Friday 8:00 p.m.	1.0	4	3.31	3	TBA	TBA	TBA	TBA
10	"Dancing in the Grotto"	December 16, 2016	Friday 8:00 p.m.	1.0	4	3.31	3	TBA	TBA	TBA	TBA
11	"Aerial Maneuvers"	January 5, 2017	Thursday 8:00 p.m.	1.2	4	3.66	6	TBA	TBA	TBA	TBA
12	"Fusion Confusion"	January 5, 2017	Thursday 9:00 p.m.	1.1	4	3.49	7	TBA	TBA	TBA	TBA
13	"Black Jacket Lounge"	January 12, 2017	Thursday 8:00 p.m	1.2	4	3.97	4	TBA	TBA	TBA	TBA
14	"Playing Your Cards Right"	January 19, 2017	Thursday 8:00 p.m	1.3	5	3.92	5	TBA	TBA	TBA	TBA
15	"Tequila Shots?"	January 26, 2017	Thursday 8:00 p.m	1.2	4	3.98	5	TBA	TBA	TBA	TBA
16	"Leaving It on the Line"	February 2, 2017	Thursday 8:00 p.m	1.1	4	3.67	8	TBA	TBA	TBA	TBA
