= Hell's Kitchen (American TV series) season 15 =

Season of television series

Hell's Kitchen
- Season 15
- Artwork for digital release
- Hosted by: Gordon Ramsay
- No. of contestants: 18
- Winner: Ariel Malone
- Runner-up: Kristin Barone
- No. of episodes: 16

Release
- Original network: Fox
- Original release: January 15 – April 29, 2016

Season chronology
- ← Previous; Season 14 Next → Season 16

The fifteenth season of the American competitive reality television series Hell's Kitchen premiered on Fox on January 15, 2016, and concluded on April 29, 2016. Gordon Ramsay returned as host and head chef, while Aaron Mitrano debuted as the Blue Team's sous-chef, replacing James Avery, and season 10 winner Christina Wilson returned as the Red Team's sous-chef, replacing Andi Van Willigan-Cutspec. Marino Monferrato returned as maître d'. Jason Thompson returned as narrator for the first time since season 12.

The season was won by country club chef Ariel Malone, with line cook Kristin Barone finishing second.

== Chefs ==
Eighteen chefs competed in season 15.

Contestant	Age(s)	Occupation	Hometown	Result
Ariel Malone	26	Country Club Chef	Hackensack, New Jersey	Winner
Kristin Barone	27	Line Cook	Chicago, Illinois	Runner-Up
Ashley Nickell (Note: Chef returned to Hell's Kitchen again on Season 17, finished at 15th place.)	27	Chef de Cuisine	Orlando, Florida	Eliminated before Finals
Jared Bobkin (Note: Chef returned to Hell's Kitchen again on Season 17, finished at 13th place.)	28	Line Cook/Professional Poker Player	Oak Park, Michigan	Eliminated after Fourteenth Service
Amanda "Manda" Palomino (Note: Chef returned to Hell's Kitchen again on Season 17, finished at 11th place.)	30	Sous Chef	Atlantic City, New Jersey	Eliminated after Fourteenth Service
Danielle "Dannie" Harrison	30	Line Cook/Amateur Boxer	Philadelphia, Pennsylvania	Eliminated after Thirteenth Service
Frank Cala	25	Marine Chef	Brooklyn, New York	Eliminated after Twelfth Service
Jackie Fuchs	32	Line Cook	Jersey City, New Jersey	Eliminated after Eleventh Service
Chad Gelso	25	Sous Chef	Philadelphia, Pennsylvania	Eliminated after Tenth Service
Joe Ricci	31	Sous Chef	Philadelphia, Pennsylvania	Eliminated after Ninth Service
Hassan Musselmani	24	Catering Executive Chef	Detroit, Michigan	Eliminated after Seventh Service
Eddie Jaskowiak	27	Sous Chef	Philadelphia, Pennsylvania	Eliminated after Sixth Service
Alan Parker	42	Sous Chef	Lancaster, Pennsylvania	Eliminated after Fifth Service
Kevin Ridlon	29	Culinary Manager	Warwick, Rhode Island	Ejected during Fifth Service
Melissa "Meese" Davis	25	College Chef	Upper Darby Township, Pennsylvania	Eliminated after Fourth Service
Vanessa Soltero	33	Airport Chef	Los Angeles, California	Eliminated after Third Service
Sherkenna Buggs	30	Personal Chef	Grand Junction, Tennessee	Eliminated after Second Service
Mark Paras	27	Line Cook	Anaheim, California	Eliminated after First Service

== Contestant progress ==
No.	Chef	Original teams				1st switch	2nd switch			3rd switch					Individuals		Finals
No.	Chef	1501	1502	1503	1504	1505	1506	1507	1508	1509	1510	1511	1512	1513	1514	1515	1516
1	Ariel	WIN	NOM	LOSE	LOSE	LOSE	BoW	LOSE	WIN	NOM	LOSE	LOSE	WIN	WIN	IN	IN	WINNER
2	Kristin	WIN	LOSE	LOSE	LOSE	NOM	NOM	LOSE	WIN	LOSE	LOSE	LOSE	WIN	WIN	IN	IN	RUNNER-UP
3	Ashley	WIN	LOSE	LOSE	LOSE	LOSE	LOSE	LOSE	WIN	LOSE	LOSE	NOM	WIN	WIN	IN	OUT	Kristin's team
4	Jared	LOSE	WIN	WIN	WIN	LOSE	BoW	NOM	NOM	WIN	LOSE	WIN	NOM	LOSE	OUT		Ariel's team
5	Manda	WIN	LOSE	LOSE	LOSE	NOM	LOSE	LOSE	NOM	WIN	LOSE	WIN	LOSE	NOM	OUT		Ariel's team
6	Dannie	WIN	LOSE	LOSE	LOSE	LOSE	LOSE	NOM	WIN	WIN	LOSE	WIN	LOSE	OUT			Ariel's team
7	Frank	LOSE	WIN	WIN	WIN	LOSE	LOSE	LOSE	LOSE	WIN	LOSE	WIN	OUT				Kristin's team
8	Jackie	WIN	LOSE	LOSE	NOM	LOSE	NOM	LOSE	WIN	NOM	LOSE	OUT					Ariel's team
9	Chad	LOSE	WIN	WIN	WIN	LOSE	LOSE	NOM	LOSE	LOSE	OUT						Kristin's team
10	Joe	LOSE	WIN	WIN	WIN	NOM	NOM	LOSE	LOSE	OUT							Kristin's team
11	Hassan	LOSE	WIN	WIN	WIN	LOSE	LOSE	OUT									
12	Eddie	LOSE	WIN	WIN	WIN	LOSE	OUT										
13	Alan	LOSE	WIN	WIN	WIN	OUT											
14	Kevin	NOM	WIN	WIN	WIN	EJEC											
15	Meese	WIN	NOM	NOM	OUT												
16	Vanessa	WIN	LOSE	OUT													
17	Sherkenna	WIN	OUT														
18	Mark	OUT															

Keywords

- WIN = Won the dinner service
- LOSE = Lost the dinner service
- BoB = Best of the Best, usually exempt from nomination
- BoW = Best of the Worst, sometimes exempt from nomination
- IN = not nominated for elimination
- NOM = nominated for elimination
- OUT = eliminated normally
- LEFT = withdrew from competition
- HOSP = eliminated due to hospitalization
- EJEC = eliminated during service

Color key
Chef was eliminated after regular nomination
Chef was eliminated after Ramsay's nomination
Chef was eliminated without nomination
Chef was eliminated from winning team
Chef was eliminated in the Cook For Your Life challenge
Chef was nominated to participate in the Cook For Your Life challenge
Chef was eliminated during service
Chef withdrew from the competition
Chef was the Best of the Best/Worst
Chef was retained after regular nomination
Chef was retained after Ramsay's nomination
Chef's nomination was voided
The winner of Hell's Kitchen
The runner-up of Hell's Kitchen

== Episodes ==
No. overall	No. in season	Title	Original release date	U.S. viewers (millions)
219	1	"18 Chefs Compete"	January 15, 2016	3.41
18 chefs entered Hell's Kitchen, where they were greeted by Marino, who presented them with a slot machine. Ashley pulled the lever, which revealed Ramsay's message to meet him in Las Vegas and dispensed plane tickets. After a parade celebration, which included season 12 winner Scott Commings, Ramsay welcomed the chefs to BLT Steak at Bally's Las Vegas, where the winner of this season would become the head chef. He also introduced his new sous-chefs, season 10 winner Christina Wilson and Aaron Mitrano, before having the chefs make their signature dishes in the BLT Steak kitchen. Team challenge/signature dish: The chefs had 45 minutes to cook their signature dish, rated from 1–5 by Ramsay. Notably goods dishes included Dannie's Thai pan-seared scallops and Jared's halibut and Alaskan king crab cake (both 4 points), while notably bad dishes included Alan's pan-seared maple glaze salmon with risotto and Kevin's chicken Caesar Piadina (one point each). Kevin was threatened with elimination on the spot as he used premade dough and salad dressing. In the last round, Hassan's pan-seared scallops scored 4 points and Manda's cornflake-fried scallops received 3, giving the men a 24–22 win. Reward/punishment: The men were rewarded with a view of Las Vegas on the High Roller, followed by dinner at Drai's Nightclub at The Cromwell Las Vegas. The women stayed at Bally's and were sent to Sterling Buffet to peel 50 pounds of shrimp and make over 1,000 pounds of truffle mashed potatoes. Upon returning to Hell's Kitchen, all the chefs were each gifted with a brand-new set of Henckels knives. Before service, Jared annoyed his teammates by trying to be a leader. Service: Rich Kids of Beverly Hills star Morgan Stewart and TV host Audrina Patridge attended opening night. Ariel, Meese, Eddie and Jared served tableside grilled shrimp bruschetta. In the women's kitchen, Vanessa burned a pizza and served cold squash, needing her teammates' help, but Sherkenna and Ashley's strong performances on meat and fish helped the women finish service. In the men's kitchen, Alan fired entrees before appetizers were finished and then overcooked scallops despite his first portion being accepted. Mark burned the pizza for Patridge's table, but Frank managed to serve an acceptable one. Jared and Eddie jumped into the kitchen to help, only to under season the risotto. After Kevin served raw lobster and two diners walked out, Ramsay kicked the men out and asked for two nominations. Elimination: The men nominated Mark and Kevin while also considering Alan. Ramsay sent Kevin back in line and eliminated Mark for his poor performance on appetizers and lack of fightback. Ramsay's comment: "Mark was a disaster from the start. The best thing I saw from him was his back as he walked out the door."
220	2	"17 Chefs Compete"	January 22, 2016	3.61
Team challenge: After receiving a demonstration from Ramsay, the chefs were tasked to make baskets of shrimp dumplings each in pairs for 20 minutes without getting distracted by strippers, a marching band and sumo wrestlers. Since the women had an extra member, Kristin, Manda and Meese worked as a trio. Despite Alan and Jared scoring 7, Frank and Hassan failed to earn a single point since their dumplings resembled pierogis. Jackie and Dannie scored 6 points and the women narrowly won, 13–12. Reward/punishment: The women went on a helicopter trip to Malibu and had lunch with Ramsay at Geoffrey's. The men prepped mushrooms and corn for the service's tableside appetizer, during which Frank and Jared got into an argument over what caused their first challenge loss. Service: Actor Dexter Darden and the sumo wrestlers attended service. Hassan and Manda served tableside corn chowder. Appetizers ran well, but Ashley forgot to turn the stove on when cooking the risotto and Joe dropped a portion of lamb and struggled remembering orders but recovered. Actor/rapper The Game then arrived, having not booked in advance, with a ten-top, requiring the teams to work together to serve the table. In the women's kitchen, Ariel served Meese's snapper while it was raw, causing Ramsay to jump in, and blamed Meese. Meese struggled with communication and Sherkenna burned the Arctic char twice, allowing Dannie to take over and serve an acceptable portion. Both teams finished service; Ramsay named the men winners for their strong finish and fewer overall mistakes. Ramsay ordered the women to nominate three chefs rather than two for elimination, marking the second time in Hell's Kitchen history this has happened, the first time being in Season 12. Elimination: The women nominated Meese, Ariel and Sherkenna. Ramsay sent Ariel back in line and eliminated Sherkenna for giving up during service and allowing Dannie to take over. Ramsay's comment: "When the Arctic char was destroyed over and over, so were Sherkenna's chances of being a head chef."
221	3	"16 Chefs Compete"	January 27, 2016	4.16
Team challenge: After greeting the chefs in French, to improve their communication, Ramsay gave each chef a jacket with a recipe on the back of it. They had to cook the recipe as one of their teammates read it to them. The men won 5–3 as Kristin's spanakopita and Manda's taquitos were ruined by miscommunication from Meese and Dannie, respectively; Chad and Dannie's dishes were not judged. Reward/punishment: The men headed to The Ritz-Carlton Bacara Resort in Santa Barbara, where they received poolside foot massages and mojito cocktails, while the women prepped 100 pounds of sea bass for the next service and had fish head soup for lunch. Service: As an additional reward, the men had the honor to cook for Apollo 11 astronaut Buzz Aldrin, while comedian Terry Fator and actress Tiya Sircar were also in attedance. Alan and Ashley served a tableside sea bass appetizer. The men had a near perfect service, their only problems being Kevin serving a raw vegetarian risotto (which Jared recovered) and nearly putting already cooked wellingtons for Aldrin's table back in the oven until Eddie and Hassan stopped him, prompting Ramsay to call him a "space cadet". In the women's kitchen, Dannie performed well on appetizers, but Vanessa struggled to remember orders, forgetting a lobster tail. Ramsay had Christina write an order on Kristin's back after she failed to remember it. Manda struggled with communication and timing on garnish, Meese threw away perfectly cooked wellingtons, and Jackie served cold Arctic char twice, causing Ramsay to lament that the team had thrown more food out than they had served. He kicked out the women and had the men finish their service. Elimination: Despite the team agreeing to nominate Meese and Manda, Ariel announced the nominees as Meese and Vanessa. Ramsay sent Meese back in line and eliminated Vanessa for her lack of confidence and communication. Ramsay's comment: "Vanessa had a lot of heart, but as far as her cooking was concerned, she made food only a mother could love."
222	4	"15 Chefs Compete"	February 3, 2016	4.60
Team challenge: The chefs were brought out to a local lake, where they were given 10 minutes to gather five rubber ducks containing ingredients. Back at Hell's Kitchen, they each made a duck dish and went head-to-head on ingredients, with Ramsay and Michelin starred chef Josiah Citrin rating each dish from 1–4. Since the men had an extra member, they chose Kevin to sit out. In the last round, Jared scored 6 points while Kristin scored 3 since her duck being overcooked, and the men clinched a 32–30 win. Reward/punishment: The men spent the afternoon sailing on a luxury yacht and had dinner with Ramsay at the Penthouse Restaurant at the Huntley Hotel in Santa Monica, during which Joe jokingly asked if he could use Ramsay as a reference after his appearance on the show. The women prepped a large delivery of duck for the next service and had duck feet sandwiches for dinner. During the punishment, Jackie's antics continued to get on her teammates' nerves, and she angered Christina by titling a prep list "The Fuckin' List". Service: A VIP guest was seated at each chef's table, with burlesque dancer/lingerie designer Dita Von Teese in the men's kitchen and TV manager/producer Kris Jenner in the women's. Frank and Dannie served duck confit tableside. The men once again had a near-perfect service, their only problems being Kevin not communicating from the meat station until Hassan took charge and led the men through their third dinner service win. The women struggled throughout the night with Ashley again forgetting to turn the stove on when cooking capellini, Manda under seasoning the risotto and Jackie serving raw chicken. However, it was Meese who failed to communicate with her teammates again and sunk on garnish when she served mashed potatoes on a tray for the chef's table. Ramsay had several of the men help the women finish service for the second night in a row. Elimination: The women nominated Jackie and Meese. Ramsay eliminated Meese for having problems with communication and being nominated three consecutive times. Team change: Following Meese's elimination, Ramsay moved Hassan to the women after being impressed with his performance during the service, hoping he could help lead them. Ramsay's comment: "After being nominated three times in a row due to the lack of communication, Meese may want to consider changing her name to Mouse."
223	5	"14 Chefs Compete"	February 10, 2016	4.40
Team challenge: The two teams had 45 minutes to create a holiday platter consisting of three dishes for three major holidays: the Fourth of July, Cinco de Mayo and Mardi Gras, with Ramsay and Family Circle editor-in-chief Linda Fears judging the dishes. The red team won 5–4 after Chad and Kevin served raw chicken and raw rice. Reward/punishment: The red team visited the Sunstone Winery in Santa Ynez, where they had lunch and created their own wine. Ariel and Ashley's dishes were also chosen to be featured in an upcoming issue of Family Circle. The blue team made candy, cake pops and cookies for family night. During the reward, an argument broke out between Dannie and Hassan, as Dannie openly stated she was opposed to Hassan leading the red team, which carried on into their return to Hell's Kitchen that night. Service: Ariel, Jackie, Chad and Jared served grilled cheese in the dining room. Actress Millie Brown and Everclear singer/guitarist Art Alexakis attended family night as well as Marino's family, who were there to celebrate his daughter's birthday. Kevin struggled on fish, dropping scallops too early and therefore hindering the rest of his team. Ramsay then proceeded to show him how to cook the scallops, only to be interrupted by Joe spilling the sauce on the grill, nearly setting the kitchen on fire. Alan served soupy risotto and then added too much cheese, making it all sticky. Ramsay threw out the blue team out after Joe served raw fish and chips. The red kitchen started off strong under Hassan's leadership, but a lack of communication between him and Dannie led to the latter forgetting an order of tuna for Marino's family before overcooking it. After the former served raw New York strip, Ramsay kicked the red team out as well. Automatic elimination: After the blue team failed to serve a single appetizer due to Kevin overcooking the scallops even after having been shown how to cook them, Ramsay sent them to the pantry room to regroup and eliminated Kevin on the spot. For unknown reasons, Kevin did not give any form of exit interview, formal or informal, whatsoever; this is only the second instance in the show's history of a non-hospitalized contestant not providing closing thoughts on their time (with the first being Jeff LaPoff from season 1). Kevin did not receive a coat-hook scene and picture burning sequence until the next episode, and he gave no comment on his departure. Elimination: The blue team nominated Joe and Alan. Without asking the red team for their nominations, Ramsay eliminated Alan for his failure on the appetizer station and irregular performances. Team change: Following Alan's elimination, Ramsay called down the red team's nominees, which were Manda and Kristin. He sent Kristin back and line and transferred Manda to the blue team due to them now being short two chefs. Ramsay's comment: "On a night when the dining room was filled with children, it was Alan who needed a babysitter. He and Kevin should both understand I'm not running a daycare."
224	6	"12 Chefs Compete"	February 17, 2016	3.97
During the recap of the previous episode, Kevin's jacket was hung and his photo was burned. Ashley and Jackie had a heated argument about the previous night's nominations (due to the former attempting to nominate the latter as the weakest chef right after promising to vouch for her), causing Ashley to break down crying and Jared to comfort her. Team challenge: The next morning, Ramsay brought the chefs to Fields Market, where they were given 10 minutes to rearrange shopping carts with letters to spell out six ingredients that the whole team would use, then one minute to obtain a personal ingredient, and finally 30 minutes to create their own dishes, with Ramsay rating them 1–5. The challenge ended in a tie, 22–22, with Ariel, Ashley and Joe's dishes settling the tie; Ramsay declared Ashley's dish the best, thus awarding the red team the win. Reward/punishment: The red team flew over Los Angeles in stunt planes. The blue team had to prepare fruit and coconuts for a Spanish sangria. Service: Guests in attendance were actors Thomas Ian Nicholas and Omar Benson Miller. Joe and Kristin served an octopus Romanesco special tableside. In the red kitchen, Ariel had a strong performance on appetizers, but Hassan was criticized for sweating in the lobster, though he recovered. Jackie struggled with communication on garnish and under-portioned fries and Dannie overcooked New York strip due to Jackie taking so long. In the blue kitchen, Jared had a strong performance on appetizers, but Joe struggled on tableside and was forced to leave to change his jacket. Eddie struggled to communicate on garnish, causing Frank to overcook Arctic char. Ramsay confronted the blue team after Chad attempted to serve raw chicken for Miller's table. Both teams finished service with no ejections, but for the second service in a row, Ramsay named no winner; however, Ariel and Jared were named Best of the Worst and each asked to nominate two chefs for elimination. Elimination: Ariel nominated Jackie and Kristin, and Jared nominated Eddie and Joe. Ramsay questioned Kristin's nomination and sent her back in line without asking for a plea. He then sent Joe back in line and eliminated Eddie for his lack of leadership and poor performance on garnish. Ramsay's comment: "Eddie couldn't lead, and he certainly couldn't follow. And so it was time to get the fuck out of the way."
225	7	"11 Chefs Compete"	February 24, 2016	4.23
After returning to the dorms, Ariel got drunk and injured her foot and was seen by the medic. Team challenge: After welcoming newlywed and red team sous-chef Andi back to Hell's Kitchen along with her husband Brice, Ramsay gave each team 45 minutes to make two seafood appetizers, two chicken entrées, and two beef entrées. Andi and Brice would choose one dish of each type to be served during their wedding reception the next night. Because the blue team was short one member, Joe agreed to cook both a seafood and chicken dish. Frank, meanwhile, made both steak and chicken without telling anyone beforehand and convinced his team not to present Manda's ribeye. The red team scored on the beef entrée, but the blue team scored on the appetizer and chicken entrée to clinch the win Reward/punishment: The blue team headed to Las Vegas where they went ziplining at the Rio and spent the night in a grand suite at Caesars Palace. The red team decorated Hell's Kitchen for the reception under the supervision of celebrity wedding advisor Kristin Banta (over whom Hassan got distracted easily) and made macaroons. Before leaving for Las Vegas, Manda angrily confronted Frank for forcing her dish out, despite the fact that the blue team won. During the punishment, Ariel was sent to the hospital, revealing she had broken her fifth metatarsal bone, but returned wearing a compression boot. Service: That night was Andi and Brice's wedding reception, with a head table to be served by both kitchens. During appetizers, in the red kitchen, Jackie under-portioned the risottos and Dannie cooked the scallops in a regular pan, causing them to stick. In the blue kitchen, Joe forgot to add herbs to his risotto and Chad overcooked scallops. Things quickly fell apart during entrees. Ramsay ordered Jared and Hassan to coordinate their kitchens to serve the head table at the same time; however both sent up raw chicken. The former managed to recover, but the latter undercooked the chicken again, forcing Ramsay to serve only half of the head table. After Chad served raw salmon, both teams managed to complete service with no ejections, but for the third service in a row, Ramsay declared no winning team. Elimination: The red team nominated Hassan and Dannie, while the blue team nominated Chad and Jared. In one of the season's biggest shockers, Ramsay eliminated early frontrunner Hassan as he felt that his performance on the meat station during service was his worst yet, in addition to his serious downward spiral since moving to the red team. Ramsay's comment: "I thought a move on the red team would give Hassan a chance to shine. Unfortunately, it only shined the light on his shortcomings."
226	8	"10 Chefs Compete"	March 2, 2016	3.38
Team challenge: In the dining room, the chefs were greeted with a performance from award-winning rock guitarist Steve Vai and the SATCHVAI Band, leading to their next challenge: they had to create dishes with seven, six, five, four and three ingredients. The red team led 3–1 with only one round left, thus winning the challenge by default, and Ramsay didn't taste Dannie and Jared's pork chops. Even though Kristin was the only red team chef not to earn a point, she still earned high praise for beautifully cooking her sea bass but losing to Manda's by an edge. The blue team's other three dishes (Frank's hangar steak, Chad's tuna and Joe's lobster) all received harsh reviews. Reward/punishment: The red team participated in a paintball match with Marino, while the blue team took in deliveries of ice and wine and prepped both kitchens. During the punishment, Manda threw her back out lifting boxes out of the van, but was eventually able to continue. Service: Actor Jonathan Loughran and actress/author Garcelle Beauvais attended this service. The red team had a near perfect service under Kristin's leadership and Ariel's concentration, with their only problem being Jackie momentarily falling behind on garnish and Dannie relying heavily on Ariel throughout, as she was uncertain of what to do. In the blue kitchen, Jared cooked the scallops off the stove, causing them to stick and Ramsay to send him out for a break. Chad and Jared then failed to communicate on entrees, while Manda was threatened with elimination on the spot after undercooking New York strip and chicken and failing to communicate with her teammates. The red team were named clear winners for having no communication issues. Team change: The blue team nominated Manda and Jared, but Ramsay called Chad down and gave him one last chance in the red team, with Dannie taking his place in the blue team. He felt that they both needed to get their confidence back after their declining performance, especially Chad. Ramsay's comment: "Chad desperately needs to regain his confidence, and Dannie is desperate to be a leader. Hopefully, their new teams will bring out the best of both of them."
227	9	"10 Chefs Again"	March 9, 2016	3.76
Team challenge: After they were greeted by a 12-year old bison named Jack, the chefs headed outside for their next challenge, where one member from each team stood in front of a different cut of bison. The two chefs for each cut competed in an archery shootout to win the right to pick the country whose ingredients would be used in their dish. All of the chef scored a point except Manda's questionable combination of pappardelle pasta and flank steak and Jackie's dry meatballs, resulting in a 4–4 tie. Ramsay broke the tie by choosing the best dish of the challenge, ultimately giving the win to Chad and the red team. Reward/punishment: The red team got to meet and feed animal actors. In addition, Ramsay rewarded each of them with their very own Vitamix blender. The blue team cleaned the carpet (which had been soiled by Jack), and made bread and butter the old fashioned way for that night's cowboy steak dinner service. Joe broke the ceramic while churning the butter twice. Service: Fox News contributor/actress Stacey Dash and Olympic gold medalist Phil Dalhausser were in attendance. The blue team managed to have a strong service, mostly due to Dannie's performance on the fish station and their consistent communication. However, Joe tossed mashed potatoes in the pan and served greasy fries, resulting in three of his teammates having to help him out. Despite this, the blue team managed to finish service. In the red kitchen, Ariel undercooked scallops for Dash's table and undercooked and then overcooked more scallops. On entrees, she continued to struggle on fish, and Jackie's attempt to help her resulted in them burning tuna. This and Ashley undercooking several rib-eyes led Ramsay to kick the red team out. While debating for nominations, Jackie revealed to her teammates she had only been cooking for three months, shocking her them, who believed she did not deserve to be there. Elimination: The red team nominated Ariel and Jackie, but Ramsay spared them both and eliminated Joe for continuing to struggle in dinner services despite performing strongly in challenges, making him the sixth person to be eliminated despite being on the winning team after Carol (season 5), Salvatore (season 7), Raj (season 8), Jeremy (season 11) and Randy (season 14). Ramsay's comment: "Joe had an amazing taste profile and was a standout in challenges. Unfortunately, for him, dinner services were just out of his reach."
228	10	"9 Chefs Compete"	March 16, 2016	3.57
After the elimination, Jackie and Kristin got into a heated argument over Jackie's cooking inexperience, causing the former to dump cigarette ash on the latter's shoulder. Kristin walked out of the argument, though later returned for the challenge. Team challenge: The teams had 30 minutes to make four types of breakfast dishes: vegetarian, meat, seafood and sweet, to be judged by Ramsay and executive chefs Suzanne Tracht and David Lefevre, who gave each dish a score between 1 and 3 stars. Since the red team had an extra member, Jackie and Ariel both made vegetarian dishes. Ashley beat Manda 9–3 on sweet, and Kristin and Frank tied at 8 apiece on meat. However, the red team was sunk by Jackie (whose dish was chosen over Ariel's due to presentation) and Chad scoring the minimum 3 stars each. Jared was worried about having broken the eggs for his Mexican tostada, but the judges thought it tasted delicious and gave him a perfect 9 and the blue team won, 25–23. Reward/punishment: The blue team flew to Palm Springs in a private plane, where they each rode all-terrain vehicles. The red team cleaned both kitchens and hand-squeezed oranges for the mimosa that was part of the next service's brunch special. During the punishment, Jackie talked with Christina about her position in the competition. The latter suggested that if the former were to restrain her ego and ask more questions, she could become a better chef, though Jackie said she did not want the red team to see her as weak for asking questions. Service: Ramsay announced that local chefs and their families would attend this service, as well as VIP chef's tables guests: award-winning hip-hop artist Flo Rida in the red kitchen and comedian Jeff Dunham and his puppet Walter in the blue. For the blue team, Jared served raw chicken twice and was kicked out, while Frank left Manda to take care of his French toast. When the toast got burned, Manda was also kicked out. For the red team, Chad served a tuna salad before Ariel could add the quail eggs and was thrown out for undercooking French toast. Jackie undercooked chicken but recovered. Ramsay merged the remaining chefs together to finish service in the blue kitchen but angrily demanded an explanation rather than nominations, for the first time in the series' history. Elimination: In addition to an explanation, Ramsay asked the chefs to name the person they did not want on their team any longer. Everyone on the blue team chose Frank, who conversely chose Manda, while the red team picked Chad, who picked Ariel. Ramsay immediately eliminated Chad for his lack of confidence and worsening performances, making him the sixth consecutive man to be eliminated. Ramsay's comment: "I gave Chad numerous chances to regain his confidence. Unfortunately, he wasted them all."
229	11	"8 Chefs Compete"	March 23, 2016	3.54
Team challenge: The teams had five minutes to gather the ingredients for three proteins: sea bass, rack of lamb and chicken breast. They had 40 minutes to prepare the three dishes, but only one chef was allowed to be in the kitchen at a time. That person had five minutes to cook before being replaced by a teammate. Jackie went first for the red team since she was the weakest chef, and the others could recover if she messed up. The challenge ended in a tie, 2–2, with the sea bass settling the tie; Ramsay gave the win to the blue team. Reward/punishment: The blue team attended a horse race as VIPs at Santa Anita Park, though Frank, still annoyed about being nominated the day before, did not enjoy the reward, annoying his teammates. The red team prepped two 100-pound lambs for service. Pre-service: During prep the next day, an argument broke out between Ariel and Kristin after the former accused the latter of lying that she did not cook a steak before service, causing sous-chef Christina to send them to the pantry to work things out. Meanwhile, Frank continued to openly resent his teammates. Christina also pulled him aside and advised him not to take his nomination personally. Service: Guests in attendance were actress Lainie Kazan and comedian Bill Engvall. Frank and Manda struggled to communicate on appetizers but recovered, while Ashley served a soupy risotto followed by one with too much cheese, and broke down. As both teams got entrees out smoothly, an impressed Ramsay declared this was the best service yet and announced that the first team to finish would win. The blue team narrowly won after Jackie served an Arctic char she knew was raw but was pushed by Ashley to serve. After service, Ramsay pulled Ashley aside and asked her why was upset, to which she said that she was "better than" her performance that night. He told her that he doesn't care if mistakes are made, it's how they're recovered from. Elimination: The red team nominated Ashley and Jackie. To the team's relief, Ramsay sent Ashley back in line and eliminated Jackie for her inconsistency, inexperience, aggressive nature and lack of maturity, but praised her for her improvement throughout the competition. Ramsay's comment: "Jackie was one of the most outspoken chefs in the history of Hell's Kitchen. It's just a shame her mouth was bigger than her talent."
230	12	"7 Chefs Compete"	April 1, 2016	2.61
Ashley was still upset over being nominated the previous night, leading Jared to comfort her, much to the disgust of Ariel, who compared the scene to a soap opera. Team challenge: Ramsay announced that the annual Blind Taste Test would be the next challenge and the chefs would have to identify ingredients infused into ice cream. Rather than sitting on top of dunk tanks, while one chef tasted the ingredients, a teammate stood in front of a cannon that would blast them with various toppings for three incorrect guesses, and whipped cream for four. Ariel scored two points while Frank failed to score any, resulting in Manda getting blasted twice. Ashley scored two while Jared only scored one, meaning Dannie got blasted, and Kristin scored three points while Manda scored two. The blue team had an extra member, so Ariel went against Dannie who like Frank failed to score (resulting in Jared getting blasted twice). The red team automatically won 7–3 after Dannie failed to identify green tea. Nonetheless, Ramsay decided to continue to challenge, and Ariel correctly identified three of four ingredients. Reward/punishment: The red team went on a $2,000 shopping spree at Roland Kitchenware. The blue team prepared the foul-smelling durian fruit for a dessert that would be featured on the menu for service. During the punishment, Frank constantly talked to sous-chef Aaron, much to the chagrin of the rest of the blue team. Fortunately, Aaron saw through Frank's attempt to suck up to him and eventually shut him down entirely before ordering him to get back to work. Service: Actress Meredith Baxter and Olympic silver medalist Haley Anderson were in attendance. The red team had an almost flawless performance, their only issues being Kristin under portioning the risotto and becoming overwhelmed on garnish (though even then she recovered), but strong performances by Ashley on fish and Ariel on meat kept the red kitchen running smoothly. The blue kitchen's service was much rockier. Frank had poor communication and served raw snapper and left the other chefs to clean up his mistakes. Dannie's poor communication also sent him astray while Manda got overwhelmed on fish. Jared had to refire the New York strip three times after sending them up first overcooked, then raw and then gashed as he tried to check the temperature by opening them up instead of using his fingers. Ramsay declared the red team the clear winners and asked the blue team for two nominations. Elimination: After much arguing, the blue team nominated Jared and Frank. Ramsay questioned each chef about what happened to the three raw snappers, which Dannie claimed she had no responsibility over despite video footage showing otherwise. Ramsay then, to the other chefs' (especially Manda's) relief, eliminated Frank for his declining performances, lack of communication and failure to take responsibility for his mistakes. Ramsay's comment: "Like all Marines, Frank was strong and very proud. Unfortunately, for him, he's just not ready for the rank of head chef."
231	13	"6 Chefs Compete"	April 8, 2016	2.66
For the third time in six seasons, Ramsay chose not to merge the final six into a united black team. Instead, he invited their loved ones for a visit: Manda's brother, Jared's mother, Dannie's sister, Ariel's mother, Kristin's father and one of Ashley's fathers. Team challenge: Each chef received a special gift, thinking they contained black jackets. However, the boxes instead each contained a straitjacket. Ramsay then tasked the chefs to wear that jacket while telling their loved ones how recreate his signature branzino dish. Jared's mother cut herself during the challenge and could not plate all the vegetables. Despite Ashley's father being a chef and owning two restaurants, Kristin and Dannie's dishes were the best from their respective teams, but Kristin and her father ultimately won it for the red team. Reward/punishment: The red team was rewarded with a spa day at Burke Williams Spa. The blue team cleaned the dorms, during which Jared had a debate with Manda and Dannie on which gender was generally less tidy. Service: The chef's table guests were TV personality Cesar Millan in the blue kitchen and recording artist Lil' Jon in the red. DJ/Dim Mak Records founder Steve Aoki and recording artist Katy Tiz sat in the dining room. The red team once again had an almost flawless service, the only problem being Kristin serving nine scallops for an order instead of ten and Ashley occasionally forgetting to communicate. As a result, they were rewarded with their new black jackets. For the blue team, Jared over seasoned the carbonara despite Dannie's warnings and had a hair in his mashed potatoes. Manda burned a snapper and Dannie struggled to communicate on meat, serving raw New York strips, cold Wellingtons and refusing to give a time on the refires. After service, Ramsay asked both teams to decide on two nominees for elimination. Elimination: The chefs nominated Dannie and Manda, although Ariel and Kristin wanted Jared to go up. Ramsay gave Jared and Manda the last two black jackets and eliminated Dannie for her poor performance on meat and her serious downward spiral since her move to the blue team, despite several warnings to step up. Ramsay's comment: "Dannie may be a boxer in her spare time, but her lack of fight tonight proved she just couldn't go the distance."
232	14	"5 Chefs Compete"	April 15, 2016	2.98
Ashley told Jared, "There's no way I was letting you go home," suggesting that Ashley did indeed talk Ariel and Kristin out of nominating Jared for the previous elimination, due to her need to protect him out of their friendship. However, the upcoming events of the episode would make her regret protecting him. Challenge: The black jackets met Ramsay at Ánimo Venice Charter High School, where he surprised them with high school photos of themselves. Jared's in particular surprised everyone due to his being bald, and he had hair in his. They were given 40 minutes to cook a unique dish to serve to 100 students. The final rankings were as follows: Jared, Ariel, Ashley, Kristin and Manda. Reward/punishment: Jared flew on a private jet to San Francisco, where he met San Francisco 49ers Super Bowl champions Dwight Clark and Guy McIntyre at Levi's Stadium and had dinner at Bourbon's Steak and Pub. He chose Kristin to join him, which irked Ashley, who had stuck up for him on numerous occasions. The other chefs had to sort the school's trash and recycling from the week before. Upon his and Kristin's return, Jared and Ashley argued over him taking Kristin out on the reward but reconciled after he apologized. Service: Sous-chefs Aaron and Christina sat at the chef's table. MMA fighter/author/actor Randy Couture and actor Neil Jackson attended this service, as well as Harry Potter actor Jason Isaacs, who was uncredited. Ramsay gave the chefs the chance to be his sous-chef. Jared served raw scallops on the first ticket of appetizers but quickly rebounded. Ariel was strong at the pass and sent back his raw lobster for the chef's table. Ashley followed but was scolded for her lack of confidence and direction after reading the wrong ticket for Couture's table. Jared then served overcooked snapper despite recovering as a sous-chef, and Manda delivered raw New York strips but recovered. She was vocal at the pass but struggled to gain the respect of her team, causing them to miscommunicate. Lastly, Kristin was deemed a good sous-chef by both Christina and Aaron but was slowed by Manda's second set of raw steaks, causing Ramsay to march the chefs into the storeroom. He then ordered the team to apologize to the sous-chefs after Jared served raw Arctic char on the last ticket and called it the worst black jacket service in the history of Hell's Kitchen before asking them to nominate one member for elimination. By this point, even Ashley had begun to regret convincing Ariel and Kristin to spare Jared in the previous episode. Elimination: The black jackets initially leaned towards nominating Manda until she convinced them to nominate Jared, but Ramsay called her up as well. He eliminated her for her worsening performances but praised her for her determination and cheerfulness; Manda wished the others good luck on her tearful exit. Ramsay then also eliminated Jared, much to everyone's shock, for not being as consistent as the remaining chefs, but praised him for his cooking ability and commitment. This marked the second ever all-female and first ever all-red team final three (and the second in a row), and also the first time since Season 6 in which the two finalists would be chosen from the final three rather than four. Ramsay's comment: "I can't deny Manda's passion nor Jared's commitment, but it was painfully obvious that they just couldn't measure up to my final three."
233	15	"3 Chefs Compete"	April 22, 2016	2.96
Ashley and Kristin discussed their belief that they wanted to be the final two over Ariel, as her attitude had begun to annoy them. Team challenge: The black jackets were greeted by a police-escorted armored truck from Las Vegas, from which four men emerged with briefcases. The first contained the $250,000 that would be awarded to the winner of Hell's Kitchen. In addition, each chef picked a briefcase containing a different bone-in steak. They then had 40 minutes to cook their steak and two sides. CUT executive chef Ari Rosenson was the guest judge. Ashley's Southwestern-style filet was praised but her poblano peppers were undercooked. Ariel's New York strip was also perfectly cooked, despite concerns that she did too much. Kristin's dish was notably simpler, though her ribeye was cooked well and received much praise. While Rosenson was impressed with all three steaks, he ultimately selected Kristin's as the best. Reward/punishment: Ramsay treated Kristin and her parents to a special lunch prepared personally by Rosenson at CUT by Wolfgang Puck in Beverly Hills. Ashley and Ariel cleaned the armored truck and motorcycles and prepped the kitchen for service. Service: In attendance was Los Angeles Angels manager Mike Scioscia was. Like the previous service, each chef took turns in leading the kitchen, with the usual sabotages from sous-chefs Aaron and Christina. Ariel went up first, and despite not recognizing carrot puree instead of butternut squash in the risotto, she was overall praised for her performance on the hotplate and was deemed a strong if demanding leader. Kristin was second and had a good run as well, spotting Aaron sending up Wellingtons with no mushroom duxelles, but called out a capellini despite it not being on the menu, though even then she instantly recognized her mistake. She also had communication problems with Ashley, who sent up an overcooked snapper, and though the former was reminded to be in control, the latter still did not respond until Ramsay called her out on it. Ashley, however, struggled at the pass, failing to get a response from Ariel before being given an undercooked risotto. She nearly broke down again but was urged to fight back. Ashley recovered to identify Ramsay replacing black pepper puree with black garlic but mistook sous-chef Christina's salmon for Arctic char. Ramsay praised the final three, though asked them to vote on the one chef to be eliminated. Elimination: Ariel and Kristin both voted for Ashley, who voted for Ariel. Ramsay named Kristin and then Ariel as the final two, eliminating an emotional Ashley. He praised her and allowed her to keep her jacket, though her photo was still burned. Ramsay's comment: "Ashley is a young chef with a very bright future. She earned her place in the final three, and I have no doubt she'll be a great success."
234	16	"Winner Chosen"	April 29, 2016	3.13
Ariel and Kristin spent the night in the Presidential Suite at the Millennium Biltmore Hotel and received a surprise visit from their families. Afterwards, they planned their menus for their final dinner service. The next morning, they received advice from season 9 winner and BLT Steak Miami head chef Paul Niedermann, then flew in a helicopter with Ramsay to the USS Iowa, where their final challenge would take place. Challenge: The finalists were given one hour to prepare their menus, consisting of a cold and hot appetizer and a chicken, beef and fish entrée. Ramsay brought in guest judges from BLT Steak's parent company, ESquared Hospitality: Clifford Crooks, Chris Macchia, Manuel Trevino, David Craine and president Keith Treyball. Each judged rated the dishes one a scale 1–10. Kristin beat Ariel 9–8 on the cold appetizer and chicken entrée, but Ariel returned the favor on the hot appetizer and fish entrée. On the beef entrée, Kristin scored an 8 while Ariel scored a 7.5, narrowly winning the challenge 42–41.5. Reward: Kristin received the first pick in drafting her bridge with the eight chefs eliminated prior to the final. Kristin picked Ashley, Frank, J and Chad, while Ariel chose Jackie, Manda, Dannie and was left with Jared. Pre-service: Both teams ran through their menus. Kristin went through slowly and methodically while Ariel rushed through her menu, leaving her team confused. Service: Singer/songwriter Johnny Gill, Eurythmics musician/songwriter Dave Stewart and actor Larenz Tate attended the final dinner service, as well as and the finalists' families. Both teams started strong but encountered problems. In Kristin's kitchen, Joe under seasoned the coleslaw but recovered quickly, Frank undercooked the duck for Kristin's parents and Chad served raw salmon, both requiring Ashley's help, while Kristin struggled to gain control after none of her team responded to her orders. In Ariel's kitchen, Manda nearly sent the wrong order on the cold appetizers also but rebounded and Jackie had a strong performance despite cutting down fish sizes while Dannie served a raw steak which she thought was cooked; the latter also had an undercooked pork chop returned from the dining room, following an overcooked one at the pass. She then talked back to Ramsay before walking out of service, and Jackie took over the meat station. This marked the first time a returning chef walked out of a finalist's dinner service. Winner: After deliberating, Ramsay called both finalists into his office and had them step in front of a door each; Ariel's door opened, making her the fifteenth winner of Hell's Kitchen. Ramsay had words of encouragement for Kristin and told her to not give up her dreams. She took her defeat graciously. Ramsay's comment: "Right from the very beginning, Ariel let her presence be known. She was always outspoken, but she backed up her confidence with her cooking. Creative, talented, and unique, she is an out-of-the box-thinker, who will make a great head chef at BLT Steak."

== Controversy ==
Following his exit at the end of episode 12, Frank, an active-duty Marine chef, stated his dislike for female chefs during his plea and claimed he never allowed any to work under him, saying, "The blue team never had any drama until the females came aboard and that's when the ship sunk. And that's exactly why I get fucking female Marines and I send them back wherever the fuck they came from." Following his comments, Marine public affairs representative Bryan Nygaard stated Frank's comments regarding female Marines "are not consistent with the Marine Corps' values of honor, courage and commitment," and he would "notify my chain of command as well as Sergeant Cala's chain of command to ensure that corrective action is being taken." Several days later, Frank was removed from his position with the Commandants' staff and transferred to the Enlisted Aide Program.

== Ratings ==
The fifteenth-season premiere of Hell's Kitchen premiered to an audience of 3.43 million, 660,000 lower than last season's premiere, and down 10,000 from season 14's finale.

U.S. Nielsen ratings
No.	Episode	Original air date	Timeslot (EST)	Rating/share 18–49	U.S. viewers (millions)	DVR 18–49	DVR viewers (millions)	Total 18–49	Total viewers (millions)	Source(s)
1	"18 Chefs Compete"	January 15, 2016	Friday; 9:00 p.m.	1.1/4	3.41	0.6	1.52	1.7	4.93	
2	"17 Chefs Compete"	January 22, 2016	Friday; 9:00 p.m.	1.3/4	3.61	—N/a	1.49	—N/a	5.11	
3	"16 Chefs Compete"	January 27, 2016	Wednesday; 9:00 p.m.	1.4/4	4.16	0.6	—N/a	2.0	—N/a	
4	"15 Chefs Compete"	February 3, 2016	Wednesday; 9:00 p.m.	1.5/5	4.60	0.6	—N/a	2.1	—N/a	
5	"14 Chefs Compete"	February 10, 2016	Wednesday; 9:00 p.m.	1.3/4	4.40	—N/a	—N/a	—N/a	—N/a	
6	"12 Chefs Compete"	February 17, 2016	Wednesday; 9:00 p.m.	1.2/4	3.97	0.7	—N/a	1.9	—N/a	
7	"11 Chefs Compete"	February 24, 2016	Wednesday; 9:00 p.m.	1.3/4	4.23	—N/a	—N/a	—N/a	—N/a	
8	"10 Chefs Compete"	March 2, 2016	Wednesday; 9:00 p.m.	1.0/3	3.38	0.7	—N/a	1.7	—N/a	
9	"10 Chefs Again"	March 9, 2016	Wednesday; 9:00 p.m.	1.2/4	3.76	—N/a	—N/a	—N/a	—N/a	
10	"9 Chefs Compete"	March 16, 2016	Wednesday; 9:00 p.m.	1.1/4	3.57	—N/a	1.44	—N/a	5.01	
11	"8 Chefs Compete"	March 23, 2016	Wednesday; 9:00 p.m.	1.2/4	3.54	—N/a	—N/a	—N/a	—N/a	
12	"7 Chefs Compete"	April 1, 2016	Friday; 9:00 p.m.	0.8/3	2.61	0.6	1.59	1.4	4.20	
13	"6 Chefs Compete"	April 8, 2016	Friday; 9:00 p.m.	0.8/3	2.66	TBA	TBA	TBA	TBA	
14	"5 Chefs Compete"	April 15, 2016	Friday; 9:00 p.m.	0.9/3	2.98	TBA	TBA	TBA	TBA	
15	"3 Chefs Compete"	April 22, 2016	Friday; 9:00 p.m.	0.9/3	2.96	TBA	TBA	TBA	TBA	
16	"Winner Chosen"	April 29, 2016	Friday; 9:00 p.m.	1.0/4	3.13	TBA	TBA	TBA	TBA	
