= Hell's Kitchen (American TV series) season 14 =

Hell's Kitchen
- Season 14
- Region 1 DVD cover
- Hosted by: Gordon Ramsay
- No. of contestants: 18
- Winner: Meghan Gill
- Runner-up: Torrece “T” Gregoire
- No. of episodes: 16

Release
- Original network: Fox
- Original release: March 3 – June 9, 2015

Season chronology
- ← Previous; Season 13 Next → Season 15

Season 14 of the American competitive reality television series Hell's Kitchen premiered on Fox on March 3, 2015, and concluded on June 9, 2015. Gordon Ramsay returned as host and head chef, while Andi Van Willigan returned as the Red Team's sous-chef and James Avery returned as the Blue Team's sous-chef. Marino Monferrato returned as maître d'.

The season was won by executive chef Meghan Gill (not to be confused with season 20 contestant Megan Gill), with line cook Torrece "T" Gregoire finishing second.

Filming for this season occurred in November 2013.

== Chefs ==
Eighteen chefs competed in season 14.

Contestant	Age	Occupation	Hometown	Result
Meghan Gill	28	Executive chef	Roanoke, Virginia	Winner
Torrece "T" Gregoire (Note: Chef returned to Hell's Kitchen again on Season 18, finished at 12th place.)	31	Line cook	Atlanta, Georgia	Runner-up
Michelle Tribble (Note: Chef returned to Hell's Kitchen again on Season 17, winning the season.)	22	Line cook	Dallas, Texas	Eliminated before finals
Milly Medley (Note: Chef returned to Hell's Kitchen again on Season 17, finished at 4th place.)	33	Executive chef	Philadelphia, Pennsylvania	Eliminated before finals
Nick Peters Bond (Note: Chef returned to Hell's Kitchen again on Season 17, and was the 2nd runner up.)	25	Private chef	Stoneham, Massachusetts	Eliminated after thirteenth service
Josh Trovato (Note: Chef returned to Hell's Kitchen again on Season 17, finished at 14th place.)	24	Chef de Cuisine	Brooklyn, New York	Eliminated after twelfth service
Alison Rivera	27	Sous chef	Manhattan, New York	Eliminated after eleventh service
Randy Bell	45	Line cook	Nashville, Tennessee	Eliminated after tenth service
Christine Hazel	30	Banquet chef	Philadelphia, Pennsylvania	Eliminated after "Cook for your life" challenge
Adam Livow	31	Amusement park chef	Freehold, New Jersey	Eliminated after eighth service
Bret Hauser (Note: Chef returned to Hell's Kitchen again on Season 18, and was the 2nd runner up.)	30	Sous chef	Delray Beach, Florida	Hospitalized before eighth service
Sarah Baumert	27	Chef instructor	Dallas, Texas	Eliminated after seventh service
Brendan Pelley	34	Executive chef	Bedford, Massachusetts	Eliminated after sixth service
Monique Booker	23	Line cook	Lynn, Massachusetts	Eliminated after fifth service
Michelle "Mieka" Houser Harris	25	Sous chef	Olney, Maryland	Eliminated after fourth service
Michael Dussault	38	Senior center chef	Hartford, Connecticut	Eliminated after third service
Cameron Spagnolo	33	Banquet chef	Jersey City, New Jersey	Eliminated after second service
Chrissa Schmerler	34	Food truck chef/owner	Bellmore, New York	Eliminated after first service

== Contestant progress ==
No.	Chef	Original teams										Switched teams		Individuals			Finals
No.	Chef	1401	1402	1403	1404	1405	1406	1407	1408	1409	1410	1411	1412	1413	1414	1415	1416
1	Meghan	LOSE	WIN	LOSE	LOSE	LOSE	WIN	LOSE	WIN	IN	WIN	WIN	WIN	IN	IN	IN	WINNER
2	T	LOSE	WIN	LOSE	LOSE	LOSE	WIN	LOSE	WIN	IN	WIN	LOSE	LOSE	IN	IN	IN	RUNNER-UP
3	Michelle	LOSE	WIN	LOSE	LOSE	LOSE	WIN	LOSE	WIN	IN	WIN	NOM	LOSE	NOM	NOM	OUT	Meghan's team
4	Milly	WIN	LOSE	LOSE	WIN	WIN	LOSE	WIN	LOSE	IN	LOSE	WIN	WIN	IN	NOM	OUT	T's team
5	Nick	WIN	LOSE	NOM	WIN	WIN	NOM	WIN	LOSE	IN	LOSE	WIN	WIN	IN	OUT		T's team
6	Josh	WIN	LOSE	LOSE	WIN	WIN	LOSE	WIN	NOM	IN	NOM	NOM	NOM	OUT			Meghan's team
7	Alison	LOSE	WIN	LOSE	LOSE	LOSE	WIN	LOSE	WIN	IN	WIN	LOSE	OUT				Meghan's team
8	Randy	WIN	LOSE	LOSE	WIN	WIN	LOSE	WIN	NOM	NOM	NOM	OUT					Meghan's team
9	Christine	NOM	WIN	NOM	LOSE	LOSE	WIN	NOM	WIN	OUT							T's team
10	Adam	WIN	LOSE	LOSE	WIN	WIN	LOSE	WIN	OUT								T's team
11	Bret	WIN	LOSE	LOSE	WIN	WIN	LOSE	WIN	HOSP								
12	Sarah	LOSE	WIN	LOSE	NOM	NOM	WIN	OUT									
13	Brendan	WIN	LOSE	LOSE	WIN	WIN	OUT										
14	Monique	NOM	WIN	LOSE	NOM	OUT											
15	Mieka	LOSE	WIN	NOM	OUT												
16	Michael	WIN	NOM	OUT													
17	Cameron	WIN	OUT														
18	Chrissa	OUT															

Keywords

- WIN = Won the dinner service
- LOSE = Lost the dinner service
- BoB = Best of the Best, usually exempt from nomination
- BoW = Best of the Worst, sometimes exempt from nomination
- IN = not nominated for elimination
- NOM = nominated for elimination
- OUT = eliminated normally
- LEFT = withdrew from competition
- HOSP = eliminated due to hospitalization
- EJEC = eliminated during service

Color key
Chef was eliminated after regular nomination
Chef was eliminated after Ramsay's nomination
Chef was eliminated without nomination
Chef was eliminated from winning team
Chef was eliminated in the Cook For Your Life challenge
Chef was nominated to participate in the Cook For Your Life challenge
Chef was eliminated during service
Chef withdrew from the competition
Chef was the Best of the Best/Worst
Chef was retained after regular nomination
Chef was retained after Ramsay's nomination
Chef's nomination was voided
The winner of Hell's Kitchen
The runner-up of Hell's Kitchen

== Episodes ==
No. overall	No. in season	Title	Original release date	U.S. viewers (millions)
203	1	"18 Chefs Compete"	March 3, 2015	4.09
Twenty initial contestants arrived at Hell's Kitchen, only to find that the doors to the restaurant locked, much to their confusion. They then saw Ramsay on the roof of the building. He told them through a megaphone that he wanted to see how committed they are to being there by jumping off the roof before they can enter and asked for volunteers. After two contestants (Ruth and Enrique) jumped off the roof it was revealed that both of them were actually stuntmen, and not real contestants. Ramsay said how happy he is that everyone volunteered, asking the real contestants to get into Hell's Kitchen and cook their signature dish. Team challenge/signature dish: Once again, the teams were divided into men (blue) versus women (red), with both teams cooking in front of a live audience, similar to the signature dish challenge from the previous season, only this time taking place inside Hell's Kitchen itself. The dishes were scored on a scale of 1–5, with 1 being a disaster, and 5 being a "truly outstanding dish". Despite the women having two 5-point dishes by Meghan and T, they were hugely let down by 1's from Mieka whose dish was "all around bad", Chrissa whose ginger crusted chicken was spat out, and Monique, who served pasta with jarred tomato sauce and argued with Ramsay about it in front of the audience, which sealed the 31–28 win for the men, who all had 3 or 4s on their dishes, their first time winning the signature dish challenge since Season 9. Reward/punishment: The men rode a hummer limousine to Saint Rocke in Hermosa Beach, where they met actor William Shatner and music prodcuer Billy Sherwood, exciting particularly Brendan and Michael. Shatner also handed out the menu books, which he autographed. The women stayed behind to reset the dining room for dinner service in addition to folding, stuffing and sealing stacks of Hell's Kitchen reservation confirmation letters. During the punishment, T argued with Monique about using jarred sauce, which the women believed had ruined their chances of winning. Service: Right before service, Chrissa was making her team unsure of her as she seemed unfocused, and asked Ramsay if she could go to the bathroom. Actor Dean McDermott, The Real Housewives of Beverly Hills stars Michael Ohoven, Joyce Giraud and football player Delanie Walker attended opening night. Josh and T served pan-seared prawns tableside. Chrissa didn't do much and wandered around a lot, gradually becoming a distraction for the women until Ramsay ordered her to go and help T on tableside while Meghan took over on garnish, after which appetizers got out quickly. Cameron had problems seasoning risottos, needing Nick's help. Michael sent boiled scallops after taking a long time to cook them but rebounded. On entrees, Bret and Milly recovered after serving up a raw lamb and the men finished the first service, leaving Ramsay fairly happy with their performance. The same could not be said for the women; Christine and Monique served raw lamb and dry pork chop for McDermott's table because Monique didn't realize her oven wasn't on. When they finally managed to cook the lamb correctly, the pork was raw. When Ramsay saw them joined by Alison, Meghan, Mieka, and T on meat yet still weren't able to push it out, he ejected the women, marking the first time since Season 7 that the men won the opening dinner service. Elimination: While the rest of the women deliberated, Chrissa broke a glass trying to make coffee, leading her teammates to believe she was in over her head and not taking her place in Hell's Kitchen seriously. Monique and Chrissa were ultimately nominated, but Ramsay also personally called out Christine. He sent Monique back in line and eliminated Chrissa for being out of her element on the signature dish, before dinner service, during dinner service, and even while she was being eliminated, as she originally wandered off towards the exit without giving Ramsay her jacket. This marked the first time since Season 8, where a member of the red team was eliminated on opening night. Ramsay's comment: "There is nothing more terrifying to Chrissa than jumping off a building. But there is nothing more terrifying to me than the thought of having her as my next head chef."
204	2	"17 Chefs Compete"	March 10, 2015	3.52
Team challenge: Both teams were brought to a local marina, where they each had to retrieve 20 crabs, which were already trapped. This also meant that most of them had to in fact learn how to navigate a rowboat; the men coped with this better, getting back first and earning themselves a 30-second head start for the next part of the challenge, where the teams were split into pairs to present 10 perfect crab cake dishes after they shucked, sautéed, and plated them. Milly, Nick, and Adam worked as a trio due to the men having an extra member. Despite the men's head start, the women won 10–7, due to Michael and Bret only presenting one plate because of Michael's sluggishness. T and Michelle were the stand-out performers, singlehandedly getting four dishes accepted by Ramsay. Reward/punishment: The women flew to Scottsdale, Arizona with Marino, where they went horseback riding and had dinner at Talavera at the Four Seasons Resort. The men had to peel shrimp and prep clams and lobsters for the next service's special. During the punishment, Cameron attempted to dictate to the others and Josh bluntly told him to back off. Just before service started, Ramsay caught Michael looking over the risotto recipe and criticized him for not having already learned it by heart. Mieka also worried her team due to not knowing the recipes for garnish. Service: Award-winning actor and TV host Jai Rodriguez and Workaholics actors Adam DeVine, Anders Holm and Blake Anderson attended service. Milly did well on hot appetizers, but Michael sent out a beet salad that wasn't on the ticket. Cameron sent up raw and overcooked scallops, so Ramsay showed him how to cook scallops to perfection. However, the former said having the latter in the kitchen only made him more nervous and intimidated; Brendan, his partner on the station, eventually helped him complete his first dish. They later burned an order of salmon and were forced to eat it. Michael took over the station in the meantime, but Brendan undercooked scallops when he returned to the station, leading to all three of them being thrown out. Minutes later, the rest of team was ejected after Nick and Josh didn't know what was on order. The women started off smoothly thanks to T's vocal leadership on the appetizer section, though this irritated Monique who found T overbearing. On entrees, Alison and Michelle gave conflicting reports to Ramsay on meat, so T ended up having to step in and supervise them as well. Mieka got completely overwhelmed on garnish and struggled to communicate with the other stations, needing Meghan's help to get back on track. Eventually, the women rallied and were named winners for completing their dinner service. The men had to come up with two nominees for elimination. Elimination: The men nominated Cameron and Michael, while also considering Brendan. Despite Ramsay being annoyed with Michael's lack of preparedness for service, he ultimately eliminated Cameron for his poor performance on the fish station, and for admitting he was intimidated by Ramsay during service. Ramsay's comment: "Cameron was too intimidated to perform when I was watching him. So I did him a favor and made sure that he doesn't have to be around me anymore."
205	3	"16 Chefs Compete"	March 17, 2015	3.79
Team challenge: After an early morning wake-up call from sous-chef James, the teams were brought outside Hell's Kitchen, where two ponds of icy water had been set up: one containing fish heads and another containing fish bodies. They were split into pairs and tasked with matching up the heads and bodies; the men accomplished this first and were given a five-minute head start in the second part of the challenge: to cook a fish entree using one of the four varieties, to be judged by Ramsay and executive chef Michael Cimarusti, who would award the best dishes a point. The women won 3–1 after Adam borrowed Milly's rice for his halibut dish, which Ramsay considered a violation of the challenge rules. Reward/punishment: The women headed to Manhattan Beach where they received surfing lessons from Anastasia Ashley and had lunch. The men hand-prepped fish for dinner service and had peanut butter and jellyfish sandwiches for lunch (which Bret refused to eat, as he felt he should be exempt due to scoring the blue team's only point). When Sous Chef James announced that lunch would be served soon, Michael misunderstood him, thinking it was lunchtime, and went upstairs to make himself something to eat, until James brought him back downstairs. While prepping the fish, Randy accidentally cut his finger to the bone and went to the hospital to get stitches, though he returned in time for dinner service. Service: In addition to Ashley, college basketball analyst Jay Williams and actor Samm Levine were in attendance. Milly and Michelle served a snapper entree tableside. Both teams had very rocky services. The women were backed up from the start by Mieka failing to produce an acceptable risotto, while T burned a flatbread pizza, and Alison and Monique overcooked scallops and blamed each other. After Christine and Mieka brought up a dry risotto and overcooked pasta on the final table of appetizers, the entire team was kicked out. Sarah made the situation worse by asking under her breath if they could try again. In the men's kitchen, Adam had a scallop salad returned for containing a piece of plastic. Michael let Milly do his work on garnish cooking flatbreads and also made an extremely dangerous mistake by heating up a pan to the point where it was smoking hot, then leaving it on top of the cold pans under the fish station; Ramsay angrily told him that had Bret or Josh unknowingly grabbed the pan, they could have sustained a third-degree burn. On entrees, Nick twice sent up raw pork and argued that he would have eaten it. The men managed to get some of their entrees out, but then Michael brought up the garnishes for a rack of lamb far too early. Nick brought up the lamb, which was totally raw, and got the entire team thrown out. Elimination: For the first time in the history of Hell's Kitchen, Ramsay went up to the dorms to demand two nominees for elimination from each team. The women nominated Christine and Mieka, while the men nominated Michael and Nick and also considered Adam for his scallop salad plastic. Ramsay eliminated Michael for his consistently poor performances, and especially because of his mistake with the hot pan, which he felt proved he was too incompetent to keep. He then warned the remaining chefs, that the next time he had a dinner service as bad as that, more than one person could possibly be eliminated. Ramsay's comment: "Fortunately for Michael, he can go back to his job at the senior center. Unfortunately for his residents, it's as the chef."
206	4	"15 Chefs Compete"	March 24, 2015	3.77
Team challenge: After the chefs spent the night playing drinking games, which Bret refused to take part in, they were brought to a football field, where they were told that they would be preparing classic American comfort foods (spaghetti, burgers, pizzas and macaroni and cheese) for their next challenge. They were split into pairs except Randy; each of them caught footballs, which would determine the ingredients they got to use for their dishes. Both teams made two dishes in each category, but prior to the judging, Ramsay announced that he would only be tasting one. Executive chefs Suzanne Goin and David Burke were the guest judges. The women narrowly won 5–4, earning their third challenge win in a row. Reward/punishment: The women went sailing and had lunch on the American Pride, where they were joined by Ramsay. The men had to peel over 500 pounds of onions, in addition to preparing both kitchens for family night. Bret remained visibly angry throughout the punishment and nearly provoked a major argument with his teammates after he openly accused them of being content to lose the challenges. Service: For the family night service, many of the comfort foods cooked in the previous challenge were on the menu. Brendan cooked a risotto that was far too small, and Bret attempted to recycle that risotto into a new one; Ramsay angrily threatened to throw them out if they attempted anything like that again. The rest of the appetizers went without any major hiccups, and entrees initially went well, despite Ramsay accusing Milly of working too slowly. When Adam and Nick overcooked the New York strip and salmon, the entire team was forced to eat them. After that, the men completed service, although Ramsay nevertheless labelled their performance embarrassing and pathetic. The women got through appetizers without much trouble except for Sarah burning scallops and Michelle needlessly adding extra salt to Alison's macaroni and cheese, rendering it inedible. However, things rapidly fell apart on entrees thanks to Mieka and Monique repeatedly serving up raw wellingtons and steaks. Mieka constantly asked the others their opinions on the temperature of a New York strip, wasting so much time that it became overcooked. To make matters worse, it was the last New York strip they had, making it impossible for them to finish service. Ramsay angrily ejected the team, after which Sous Chef Andi informed him that Sarah had served up a raw burger, which an irate Ramsay brought out to the team in the corridor, before telling the women to decide on two nominees for elimination. Elimination: While the women agreed that Mieka and Monique had been the two worst performers of night, T suggested nominating Monique and Sarah, hoping Ramsay would eliminate Monique. Monique informed Ramsay of the team's plan to rig the elimination, but Ramsay called her and Sarah down anyway, before sending them back in line and eliminating Mieka for struggling in three straight services and lacking confidence in herself. Ramsay's comment: "You've heard of the saying, 'The meek shall inherit the Earth'. Well, the Mieka shall not inherit the position as my next head chef."
207	5	"14 Chefs Compete"	March 31, 2015	3.35
Team challenge: In the dining room, the teams were presented with an array of cheeses from different countries and a wheel. Certain chefs picked one member from the opposing team, who would then spin the wheel to determine what cheese dish they would be making. The women won 5–4 after Bret undercooked his calzone. Reward/punishment: The women went jet skiing in Marina Del Ray, while the men had to break pieces off of a huge Parmesan cheese wheel, then grate the cheese, which would then be served as that night's tableside appetizer. Service: Recording artist Daddy Yankee and Megadeth guitarist Dave Mustaine attended this service. Nick and Alison served a Parmesan Frica tableside appetizer. The women started off well thanks to Meghan's strong leadership on appetizers but were soon backed up by Monique undercooking and underseasoning spinach and eggplant. Meghan jumped on the garnish section, but in her absence, Sarah undercooked risotto, while Christine also undercooked salmon. Ramsay brought the team into the pantry to give them a final warning, only for Christine's next order of salmon to turn out burnt, leading to the whole team being ejected. In the men's kitchen, Adam served risotto stuck to the pan but recovered. Bret also overcooked their first order of salmon but likewise got his remaining orders out correctly. Brendan struggled to communicate times on meat, overcooking lamb before holding up the kitchen for fifteen minutes on the refire. After this, the men finished dinner service. Ramsay was so disgusted by the women's performance that he sent Sous Chef Andi up to the dorms to tell them to nominate two people for elimination. Elimination: The women quickly decided on Monique as the first nominee, and went with Sarah as the second nominee despite also considering Christine. Despite Ramsay criticizing Sarah for not bouncing back, he eliminated Monique for her refusal to admit her mistakes, being totally shunned by her team, and lack of improvement over five services. Ramsay's comment: "Monique acted like she was the victim, but the real victim was anyone who had to eat her food tonight."
208	6	"13 Chefs Compete"	April 7, 2015	3.50
Team challenge: The teams were tasked to cook lunch for current and retired firefighters who were in the middle of their charity ride to commemorate their friends. Both teams started reasonably well, though the women were held up slightly by Sarah's slowness at dressing the salads. Milly and T held up their respective teams by serving up raw chicken (which luckily Sarah noticed for the women). While Milly was quickly able to regroup and get the chicken out correctly, T and Sarah continued to struggle, before Meghan helped them get the orders cooked perfectly. The women soon found their rhythm and began catching up to the men, but the men finished one ticket ahead and won their second challenge of the season, ending their four-challenge losing streak. Reward/punishment: The men headed to Malibu for a private safari tour at Saddlerock Ranch, followed by lunch and wine tasting with Ramsay at the vineyard. During their lunch, their server turned out to be Nick's ex-girlfriend, much to the surprise of his teammates, as he is openly gay. The women had to clean the fire trucks and prep over 400 chicken wings for the next dinner service. During the punishment, Meghan dragged the women into the pantry and angrily accused them of not putting as much effort into service as she did. While the others (especially Alison) felt somewhat insulted by Meghan insinuating they were unworthy to work with her, Ramsay felt that she was showing the passion needed to lead the team and told her to step up in service. In a deleted scene, the women also had to eat two full buckets of chili with one being six-alarm hot and the other being less hot. Sarah didn't eat as much as the others and Meghan revealed she is lactose intolerant. Service: Bret and T served a tableside special of chicken wing lollipops, with Marino emphasizing the importance of talking to and entertaining the customers, something that Bret found himself having to do a lot, due to his team's struggles, when he entertained actress Bree Turner. The men were stalled out of the gate by Nick overcooking scallops twice, and things got worse on the entrees. Nick and Brendan were thrown out for undercooking salmon and halibut, while Josh was also thrown out for undercooking Wellington and lamb. After this, they rallied and successfully finished service, with Randy earning praise from Ramsay after taking over meat from Josh. In the women's kitchen, Christine served a bland, undercooked risotto, while Sarah also struggled to get the garnishes out. Meghan took it on herself to supervise both stations, as well as handling the fish. While her abrasive leadership continued to annoy her teammates, the women got through the rest of the service without a single dish being rejected, and with Meghan and Alison doing especially well on the fish and the meat stations. As a result, Ramsay deemed the women to be the clear winners, and told the men to nominate two for elimination. Elimination: The team very quickly decided on the two fish station chefs, Brendan and Nick, and Brendan's arguing of the decision resulted in a heated argument between him and Milly. Ramsay eliminated Brendan for refusing to admit to his errors on fish, along with his consistently mediocre performances. Ramsay's comment: "Brendan considers himself a well-read chef. Unfortunately, it's only his books that have a spine."
209	7	"12 Chefs Compete"	April 14, 2015	3.63
After dismissing the teams, Ramsay called out Josh and warned him that he was not stepping up as a leader, and that he needed to be more assertive. Josh subsequently went into the dorms and gave himself a lengthy motivational speech, much to the bemusement of the other chefs. Team challenge: The teams were given a display of Greek dancing, setting the theme for the next challenge. They each randomly chose a protein to cook with and were given seven minutes to break plates, which would determine their ingredients, followed by 40 minutes to cook their dishes. Ramsay and Michelin starred chef Michael Psilakis would both award each chef between 1 and 5 points. The men narrowly won 41–40, with Nick receiving 5 points to Sarah's 7 since his swordfish was badly overcooked. Reward/punishment: The men went go-kart racing at K1 Speed, with 2013 Miss California Mabelynn Capeluj hosting their reward. The women had to pick up all the pieces from the broken plates and clean both kitchens for that night's service. Sarah spent most of the punishment wandering around trying to find a place to plug in a vacuum cleaner, much to the annoyance of her teammates. Before service, Ramsay pulled Milly, who was having a crisis of confidence about his level of experience, into the pantry for a pep-talk. Service: Capeluj and actor Erik Palladino were in attendance. Josh and Michelle prepared a seared octopus appetizer tableside. The men got through the appetizers without any major problems, thanks to Nick. On entrees, Randy added too much cream to his mashed potatoes and then tried to deny being responsible for it, causing a lengthy argument among the team. Milly served poorly sliced wellingtons and Adam used far too much oil to fry the fish. Meghan and T were flawless on appetizers, but Alison served raw lobster and burned her poaching butter, forcing her to make a new batch and further holding up the team. The women disintegrated on entrees as Christine served raw and then burnt eggplant, needing Meghan to help her, while Sarah served raw wellingtons and overcooked lamb. Ramsay kicked out the women after Sarah overcooked lamb and burned chicken while Christine served garlicky lentils, before calling in the men to finish their remaining eight tables. Elimination: The women nominated Sarah and Christine, though briefly considered Alison for her early problems on the fish station. Sarah asked to be transferred to the men's team; Ramsay denied her request and eliminated her for her successive terrible dinner services. Ramsay's comment: "Sarah kept telling me she was here to learn. Unfortunately, for her, I'm not looking for learners, I'm looking for leaders."
210	8	"11 Chefs Compete"	April 21, 2015	3.74
Team challenge: Each team member was given 45 minutes to create a dish out of an alcoholic beverage, either beer, wine or liquor. Their dish would then be judged by Ramsay, Marino and Cheers actor John Ratzenberger. Before the judging began, Ramsay announced the judges would only taste three dishes from each team (one beer, one wine, one liquor) on a scale from 1–5. Michelle's chocolate beer soufflé scored 11 points, while Nick's sweet potato donut with a beer and caramel sauce still earned a respectable 10. Alison's ribeye with port wine sauce and Adam's lamb with wine and poached pear reduction each earned 10 points as well. In the liquor round, Meghan's pan-seared duck breast got praise for presentation but only scored 9 points due to lack of acidity. Josh's grilled pork scored 11 points, clinching a 31–30 win for the men. Reward/punishment: The men went roller skating at the Moonlight Rollerway in Glendale and had lunch with sous-chef James at the Golden Road Brewery. The women had to steam, starch and iron tablecloths in addition to washing the silverware. Bret's exit: The next day, while both teams were prepping for dinner service, Bret took a bathroom break, during which he aggravated an existing slipped disc (though this could have happened while he was skating as he fell on his back). He was escorted to the dorm by his teammates to rest, but when Ramsay found out about his injury, he went up to the dorms and told Bret he could not continue in the competition as it could lead to permanent back injuries but praised him for his hard work and determination. Bret did not receive a coat-hanging and picture-burning sequence, but his burned picture was seen next to Nick's. He would return to Hell's Kitchen in Season 18. When Ramsay informed the chefs of Bret's departure, Nick remained unsympathetic, calling it a "blessing in disguise", as he had one less opponent to compete against. Service: Chef's tables were featured during gastropub night. Actor/comedian Fred Willard and actor Jaleel White dined in the men's and women's kitchens, respectively. Pop-rap group Far East Movement sat in the dining room. In addition, Meghan and Milly handled beer steamed razor clam tableside appetizers. The women had an almost flawless service except for Christine getting confused over what appetizer was on order, and Alison serving raw lamb and then blaming it on Michelle, but both of them recovered quickly. The same could not be said for the men. Adam on meat struggled to communicate with Randy on fish, falling behind on New York strip when Randy's fish and chips were ready. Randy brought scallops before Josh's risotto was ready and burned fish and chips. After Adam overcooked and undercooked lamb while Randy sent soggy fish, Ramsay ejected the men and told them to nominate two people for elimination, while the women would finish their service. Elimination: The men nominated Adam and Randy due to their problems on their respective stations. Ramsay also nominated Josh for not taking any initiative to support Adam on the meat station. In the end, Ramsay eliminated Adam for being the main reason the men lost dinner service and was also disappointed that he did not bounce back. Ramsay's comment: "Bret's competition may have ended in the bathroom today, but it was Adam's failure on the meat station that flushed his dream down the toilet."
211	9	"9 Chefs Compete"	April 28, 2015	3.25
Team challenge: The chefs were presented with a series of domes, each containing an exotic protein. The first person from each team who grabbed the meat first would cook a dish using that protein, to be judged by chefs Jon Shook and Vinny Dotolo, who then scored each dish on a scale of 1 to 5. Since Michelle didn't pick her protein, she chose alligator. In the last round Randy beat Christine 12–6 on ostrich, as Christine's dish was deemed bland and too safe, resulting in a 34–33 win for the men. Ramsay asked Michelle to present her alligator dish which was dropped in favor of T's. The judges concluded that it was the best dish of the day and would have received a perfect score of 15. Reward/punishment: The men were rewarded with a spa day at The Lounge Spa in Culver City. The women had to deep clean both kitchens. For lunch, they had milkshakes consisting of leftover exotic proteins from the challenge except for the alligator that Michelle ended up with; she was given a regular milkshake. Meetings: Ramsay met with each chef individually, giving them feedback on their performance, as well as advice for the rest of the competition. He asked each chef to rank the rest of their team. After the evaluations, he announced that the bottom-ranked chef from each team would compete in Hell's Kitchen's second Cook for Your Life challenge with the loser being eliminated. These were Randy for the men, and Christine for the women. Cook for your life: Randy and Christine made a few small errors, but overall prepared acceptable dishes. However, Christine forgot the tomato confit in her risotto and attempted to make her own base for her bread pudding instead of using the base Ramsay had prepared, causing it to turn out very dry. These factors led to her elimination. Ramsay's comment: "Christine clearly didn't have the faith and confidence of her team. After giving her a chance to cook for her life, she didn't do enough to change their mind or mine."
212	10	"8 Chefs Compete"	May 5, 2015	3.75
Team challenge: The next dinner service was Calabasas High School's homecoming dinner where the theme was Mardi Gras. For their next challenge, both teams had 35 minutes to create a menu of one seafood appetizer, one chicken entrée, and one beef entrée to be judged by the homecoming committee. The women scored on the chicken entrée, but the men scored on the appetizer and beef entrée to clinch their fifth challenge victory in a row. Reward/punishment: The men attended a show at Pirate's Dinner Adventure in Buena Park, while the women had to decorate the dining room and make bead necklaces for all 200 guests from scratch, with the homecoming committee supervising them. During the punishment, T accused Michelle of trying to fit in with the committee and worrying too much about what T was doing instead of focusing on herself. Service: Both teams had a few speed bumps during the appetizer stage. In the women's kitchen, T accidentally started a fire on the fish station, and Michelle held up an otherwise complete table with sliders. In the men's kitchen, Josh served an alcoholic risotto and then undercooked pasta. On entrees, Milly forgot to turn the stoves on and then served raw snappers. Randy forgot to add the lobster to his sauce for the entree, but after that, the service went smoothly. In the women's kitchen, Meghan threw Michelle off the meat station even though Michelle originally was on there, thus forcing Michelle to switch to garnish. T overcooked red snapper, but quickly recovered. Alison tried to lead the team, but only managed to annoy them by saying "all day" repeatedly; regardless, they finished without further incident. Ramsay said that both teams did well, but gave the women the win in a close decision and asked the men to nominate their two weakest members. Team change: After much deliberation, the men nominated Josh and Randy. When Ramsay asked Josh who he thought was the weakest, he accused Nick of hiding behind the other people on the team. He decided to send Randy back in line and told Josh to give him his jacket, only to transfer him to the red team in exchange for Meghan, hoping she could whip them into shape, much to their delight. Ramsay's comment: "This was the first time I've seen Josh and Randy perform that poorly. So I decided to give them a second chance. Hopefully, having new teammates will ensure it never happens again."
213	11	"8 Chefs Compete Again"	May 12, 2015	3.26
Team challenge: The teams participated in the annual Blind Taste Test, where each chef had to identify ingredients only by taste and nothing else. The dunk tanks from the previous season returned. Milly scored a perfect four out of four (only done once before by Justin Antiorio in Season 10), and Meghan scored three, but Nick and Randy each only identified one, so they both got each other dunked. For the red team, Josh scored three, while the others each scored two. With the score tied at 9 apiece, Josh and Milly were brought forward to break the tie in a sudden death match. Josh correctly identified avocado, earning the red team a 10–9 win and ending their five-challenge losing streak. Reward/punishment: The red team was rewarded with a lunch at Petrossian, where they got to sample caviar, followed by a $500 shopping spree at Kitson. The blue team had to make sangria (including preparing all of the fruit) and bring in tabletops to the dining room for that night's service. Service: This service was a special charity service. The red team cooked for actress Fran Drescher's Cancer Schmancer, whose table included Drescher, actor Ray Abruzzo and writer/director Peter Marc Jacobson. The blue team cooked for Stand Up Women's Network, whose table included actress Amy Davidson. One member of each team took charge of a course. Alison got her risottos out without any problems, but Randy cooked portions in separate pans, leading to them being seasoned differently, and then didn't notice that Milly accidentally put out 16 plates instead of the 12 required. Milly led the tuna niçoise course without any major problems, aside from Nick being caught wiping a plate with a dirty rag. However, the red team overcooked all of their tuna, mostly due to Josh ignoring Alison's warnings that it was going to be overcooked and was forced to retrieve some leftover tuna from the blue team. Josh then continually tried to take over the leadership role from both T's salmon course and Michelle's New York strip course, earning him the ire and annoyance from his teammates and Ramsay, while Nick and Meghan had no problems on the salmon and New York strip except for Randy taking the salmon out of the oven too early. Ramsay deemed the blue team winners, but only by a small margin and told the red team to come up with two nominees for elimination. Elimination: The red team nominated Josh and Michelle for their ineffective leadership. However, Ramsay sent both of them back in line and eliminated Randy due to his serious downward spiral, inexperience and lack of bounce back after his subpar leadership on his course, despite him being on the winning team. However, Ramsay praised him for performing well up to that point and being one of the fastest learners in Hell's Kitchen history. Ramsay's comment: "I loved Randy's work ethic. Unfortunately, his positive attitude couldn't camouflage his lack of experience."
214	12	"7 Chefs Compete"	May 19, 2015	3.51
Team challenge: The chefs were given 35 minutes to go through a big pile of keys to find ones that would open lockers containing various cuts of steak, then cook the steak they unlocked. Ramsay judged the dishes in a "King of the Hill" challenge. T initially got to sit on the throne with her rib-cap, topping Milly's New York strip and Josh's porterhouse. Meghan managed to dethrone T with her own porterhouse, then Alison's ribeye and Nick's New York strip also missed the mark. Last up was Michelle, who beat Meghan and won the challenge for the red team, even though she spent the first 10 minutes trying to open a locker and ended up with the cheapest cut of steak (flank steak). Reward/punishment: The red team headed to Catalina Island, where they went on a submarine ride and had a four-course dinner at the Catalina Country Club. Ramsay also rewarded them a key, which revealed four Vitamix blenders inside a treasure chest. The blue team broke down a 250-pound side of beef for the next service. Service: High stakes were added to steak night with black jackets on the line during the chefs' final service as two teams. Actor/fitness trainer Jake Steinfeld and former World Series champion Jerry Hairston Jr. were in attendance. Michelle's winning challenge dish was included on the menu. Both teams breezed through appetizers, save for Michelle serving watery capellini. On entrees, Nick served scorched, dried salmon and Meghan made a rare mistake for her with a raw New York strip, but the blue team completed their final orders with no further problems and Ramsay rewarded them with a "dessert": their new black jackets. For the red team, Alison undercooked filets and salmon due to her inexperience on the fish station, and Josh fell behind the team on garnish while arguing with T, resulting in Ramsay sending out one table's order half finished. After Alison overcooked the salmon refire, Ramsay replaced her on the fish station with T, which sped their service back up again. He also summoned Meghan, Milly and Nick to help the red team finish up their service. The final seven chefs were tasked collectively to come up with two people for elimination. Elimination: The red team nominated Alison and Josh. After giving Michelle and T black jackets, Ramsay then called Josh and Alison forward, ultimately eliminating Alison for her failures on the fish station, although acknowledging her flashes of brilliance, before giving Josh the final black jacket. Ramsay's comment: "Alison had a strong voice in the kitchen. Unfortunately, she couldn't talk her way into a black jacket."
215	13	"6 Chefs Compete"	May 19, 2015	3.51
Challenge: The black jackets faced the Taste it, now Make It challenge. Nick and Michelle won by correctly identifying the protein as sea bass and the seasoning of the broth as soy sauce. Josh and Meghan misidentified the sea bass as halibut, and Milly and T misidentified the broth as sake. Reward/punishment: Nick and Michelle were rewarded with a trip in an amphibious car to the RMS Queen Mary in Long Beach, where they had lunch, while the others had to separate recyclables from the trash. Ramsay also volunteered them to cook 150 lb (68 kg) of mashed potatoes from scratch to donate to the organization Midnight Mission (this especially hit Milly hard, because he had been homeless three times before in his life). During the punishment, Josh continued to annoy his teammates due to his minimal contribution, both during recycling and cooking. Service: Award-winning actress Tatum O'Neal and her son, Sean McEnroe dined at the chef's table. Michelle served two Caesar salads on plates rather than in bowls. Meghan did well with the risottos, but Nick derailed her progress by adding cold lobster tails to them. On the chef's table, Michelle fell behind on her tuna and then nearly undercooked it. On entrees, Josh allowed a fire to erupt on his station and fell behind T when she quickly walked up the salmon, as he had not finished the lamb. He lied that T had not told him she was getting ready to walk her salmon when she actually had. Josh made things worse by undercooking chicken for the chef's table. When O'Neal decided that her Wellington was too raw, she asked for a halibut instead, which T cooked for her with no problems. Ultimately, service was completed with a perfectly cooked lamb from Josh, who had to recover from a series of mistakes and stumbles. Elimination: Ramsay praised the final six for their strong service as one team, but he still asked them to go upstairs and nominate two for elimination, which turned out to be Josh and Michelle. After much thought, Ramsay eliminated Josh due to his long downward spiral, much to everyone else's relief and delight, but praised him for his passion as well for bouncing back on after a string of bad services. Ramsay's comment: "Josh had great passion and a strong service tonight. Unfortunately, it was too little, too late."
216	14	"5 Chefs Compete"	May 26, 2015	3.33
Challenge: The five chefs had 45 minutes to cook small plates for the guests at a private concert, which featured a performance by the UCLA Herb Alpert School of Music orchestra. The guests then tasted and ranked the dishes from best to worst. Milly's Cajun shrimp hush puppies won in a blowout decision, with 55% of the vote. Meghan's lamb chops was the next closest with 18%. Reward/punishment: Milly went on a helicopter tour of Los Angeles and chose T (whose dish received the fewest votes at 3%) to join him. The other chefs separated peppercorns and used a mortar and pestle to ground them. They also set up the stations for the next service. When Milly and T returned to help finish prepping the kitchen, Michelle left the kitchen to use the bathroom, and her beurre monte boiled over and started a small fire. Service: Actors Robert Davi, Winter Ave Zoli and actress/singer Charo were guests for this service. Sous-chefs Andi and James were given the night off and attended service as well. Each of the chefs took a turn acting as Ramsay's sous-chef. Milly earned praise for detecting scallops that were not seared on one side but then took over the fish station and made the same mistake and had troubles with the scallops for the rest of service. He blamed this on Michelle, who had been working at the fish station, not explaining the station to him. Michelle annoyed the others during her turn as sous chef by constantly shouting "pick it up", though received praise from Ramsay. T called out an order to Nick on the meat station, which he acknowledged. However, when they switched places later, the former discovered that the latter had not started the order, which created a lengthy delay. Nick, feeling the brunt of all of his mistakes, faltered on running the pass, but ultimately managed to rally and get the final orders out to the guests. Only Meghan and T had flawless performances both in the kitchen and as sous-chefs. Elimination: The black jackets quickly agreed on Nick as the first nominee but were divided on the second. Milly had a rough service, but T and Meghan did not want to put him up, leaving Michelle as the second. Ramsay overruled Michelle's nomination and instead called up Milly for making far more mistakes at his own station, despite being a superior sous-chef. He ultimately eliminated Nick for deteriorating service performances but praised his overall strong performance in the competition. Ramsay's comment: "Having the remaining black jackets work as my sous chefs was an eye-opening experience. Unfortunately, for Nick, it helped me see he's not the leader I'm looking for."
217	15	"4 Chefs Compete"	June 2, 2015	3.28
Challenge: The final four were brought to Bristol Farms, where each was given $25 and 10 minutes to shop for ingredients. Back at Hell's Kitchen, they were each given 30 minutes to make a restaurant quality vegetarian dish. Although all of the chefs struggled (except Michelle, who used to be a vegetarian), Meghan won the challenge with her zucchini angel hair pasta - her first challenge win after nine consecutive losses. Reward/punishment: Meghan went parasailing in Newport Beach and had a three-course dinner at Studio Restaurant at the Montage Laguna Beach Resort. She chose T to join her. Milly and Michelle had to clean Hell's Kitchen's exterior, as well as polish the wood in the grand hall by hand. In addition, Ramsay had them vacuum, shampoo, and clean the red carpet. Service: Just prior to service, the chefs' families were invited to see them - Michelle's boyfriend and sister, Meghan's mother, T's girlfriend and daughter, and Milly's girlfriend and son, who Milly had based his challenge dish around. In attendance were actress Tamara Taylor, former American Idol winner Taylor Hicks, award-winning recording artists Il Volo and REO Speedwagon singer/guitarist Kevin Cronin. Like the previous service, all the chefs had an opportunity to run the pass, with sous-chef Andi filling in for the chef running as the leader. However, she would deliberately make errors in order to expose the chefs' weaknesses. Milly ran first, and despite failing to spot crab in a risotto instead of lobster, he received praise for his leadership and caught mistakes the other chefs had made. However, he struggled again on his own station, serving a risotto with no cheese and another one that was soupy. Meghan ran next. She was considered a better, if harsh leader than Milly, though she also failed to spot sea bass being used instead of halibut. Michelle struggled as leader; despite constantly ordering her team, they paid little attention to her and Ramsay kept reminding her to be more authoritative. Michelle initially spotted Andi sending up broccoli instead of cauliflower, though later changed her mind upon tasting it, which led Ramsay to again help her. During Michelle's time as chef, T was reprimanded for taking too long on a wellington. T was last to perform as head chef. She led strongly and was the only one to spot her mistake, catching a lamb wellington instead of beef. Ramsay commended the chefs for doing so well and told them all to think about who should be in the final two with them. Meghan voted for Michelle and had votes from T and Michelle, while Milly voted for T. Elimination: After asking each chef who they believed did not deserve to progress, Ramsay first eliminated Milly but gave him praise. On his emotional exit, a teary-eyed Milly wished good luck to the other chefs. His exit also marked the first time that there was an all-female final three. Ramsay named Meghan, who had been "rock solid", as the first finalist, before choosing T to compete against Meghan in the final. Michelle was praised, as the youngest chef in the competition, for beating out people with much more experience than her. After elimination, Ramsay praised the two finalists. He introduced a mystery figure behind a door, before the episode ended in a cliffhanger.
218	16	"Winner Chosen"	June 9, 2015	3.42
Pre-challenge: Ramsay introduced season 10 winner Christina Wilson. The finalists flew out to Las Vegas, where they spent the night at the Paris Las Vegas and had lunch with Christina at Gordon Ramsay Steak. Upon their return to Los Angeles, Ramsay invited Meghan and T to his home, where they met his wife Tana and daughter Tilly; the finalists were then brought out to Ramsay's backyard, where they were given their final challenge. Challenge: Meghan and T were given one hour to create five dishes (one cold appetizer, one hot appetizer, one fish entree, one chicken entree and one beef entree), which would then be judged by an array of top chefs who would decide the winner of the challenge. T won the challenge 42-41. Reward: T got the first pick of the last eight chefs eliminated. T picked Milly followed by Nick, Adam, and Christine. Meanwhile, Meghan picked Michelle, Alison, Josh, and was left with Randy. This was the first time since Season 8 where every chef who was scheduled to return for the final dinner service was able to do so. Service: The chef's tables for the final service included actress Tiffani Thiessen in T's kitchen and singer-songwriter/actress Lisa Loeb in Meghan's. Actor Robert Englund and the finalists' families sat in the dining room. Both teams got through the appetizer stage smoothly, despite minor consistency issues with Michelle and Christine. However T's team started slowing down on entrees as Adam repeatedly undercooked rib-cap steaks, which forced T to switch him with Nick on garnish. However, she was forced to put Nick back on garnish again when Adam was not communicating, and delegated Christine to support Adam on garnish after she sent up dry truffle mac. Meghan's team was held back by Randy constantly overcooking chicken. After Meghan caught him putting sliced chicken back in the oven, she put him on desserts and had Michelle take over. Despite these setbacks, both teams finished their service. This was the first final since Season 10 in which nobody was thrown out of service. Winner: Ramsay congratulated both finalists on their strong services, and told them that he would have a hard time determining a winner. After analyzing the service and overall performance, he called both of them into his office, where he praised them for their performance up to that point. Afterwards, he asked them to go to their respective doors where Meghan's door opened making her the fourteenth winner of Hell's Kitchen; T took her defeat graciously. Ramsay's comment: "Meghan has every quality I look for in a head chef. She is passionate, determined, and has an amazing palate. But most importantly, Meghan is a born leader who makes every chef in her kitchen better. Talent like hers comes along very rarely, and I have no doubt she'll be a great success in Atlantic City."

== Ratings ==
=== U.S. Nielsen ratings ===
The fourteenth-season premiere of Hell's Kitchen premiered to an audience of 4.09 million, 0.18 million lower than last season's premiere, but up 0.49 million from season 13's finale.

No.	Episode	Original air date	Rating/share 18–49	U.S viewers (million)	Source(s)
1	"18 Chefs Compete"	March 3, 2015	1.4/5	4.09	
2	"17 Chefs Compete"	March 10, 2015	1.3/4	3.52	
3	"16 Chefs Compete"	March 17, 2015	1.3/5	3.79	
4	"15 Chefs Compete"	March 24, 2015	1.3/4	3.77	
5	"14 Chefs Compete"	March 31, 2015	1.2/4	3.35	
6	"13 Chefs Compete"	April 7, 2015	1.2/4	3.50	
7	"12 Chefs Compete"	April 14, 2015	1.3/4	3.63	
8	"11 Chefs Compete"	April 21, 2015	1.2/4	3.74	
9	"9 Chefs Compete"	April 28, 2015	1.1/4	3.25	
10	"8 Chefs Compete"	May 5, 2015	1.2/4	3.75	
11	"8 Chefs Compete Again"	May 12, 2015	1.2/4	3.26	
12	"7 Chefs Compete"	May 19, 2015	1.3/5	3.51	
13	"6 Chefs Compete"	May 19, 2015	1.3/4	3.51	
14	"5 Chefs Compete"	May 26, 2015	1.1/3	3.33	
15	"4 Chefs Compete"	June 2, 2015	1.1/4	3.28	
16	"Winner Chosen"	June 9, 2015	1.1/3	3.42	
