= Fields Market =

American grocery store in Los Angeles, California, USA

- Headquarters: West Hills, Los Angeles, California

Fields Market was an independent grocery store in West Hills, Los Angeles, California. Formerly an Alpha Beta grocery store, it was known as West Hills Market prior to 2004, and it was renamed when new co-owners Bill Rinck and Richard Smith opened the store in March 2004. The store was known for its use as a filming location in commercials, TV shows, and movies.

== History ==
The storefront, located in a residential area in West Hills, was previously an Alpha Beta that opened in the 1950s. Sources disagree on when Rinck and Smith became owners of the store; according to Rinck and Smith, Fields Market opened in 1993, but the Los Angeles Times reported that Fields Market was purchased for $700,000 and opened in March 2004. The store closed permanently on December 31, 2024.

== Films and series filmed on location ==
- 7th Heaven (TV series)
- Alvin and the Chipmunks (film)
- Animal Kingdom (TV series)
- Barry (TV series)
- Bird Box (film)
- Birds of Prey (2020 film)
- Bones (TV series)
- Criminal Minds
- Curb Your Enthusiasm
- Desperate Housewives
- The G Word ("Food")
- Guy's Grocery Games (season 1)
- Hit and Run (2012 film)
- Matchstick Men
- NCIS (TV series)
- The Office (American TV series)
- American Horror Story (Season 7, 10)
- 9-1-1 (Los Angeles)
