= Christina Wilson =

American chef (born 1979)

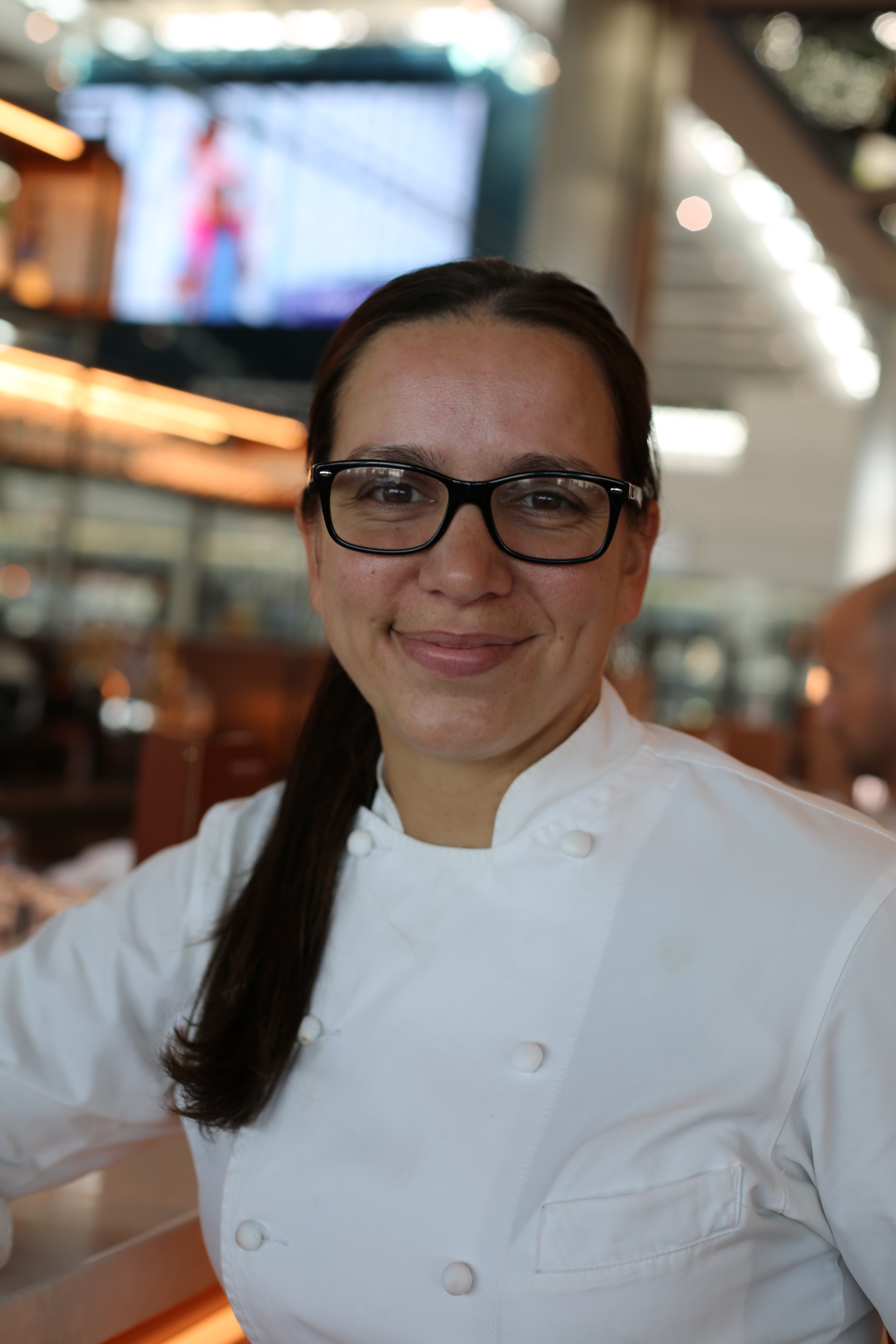
- Wilson in 2017
- Born: Christina Michelle Wilson; January 15, 1979 (age 47); Phillipsburg, New Jersey, U.S.
- Education: West Chester University (attended); Temple University
- Culinary career
- Cooking style: American
- Previous restaurants
- West Chester Country Club; Lolita BYOB; Gordon Ramsay Steak; Gordon Ramsay BurGR; Gordon Ramsay North America
- Television show
- Hell's Kitchen

Christina Michelle Wilson (born January 15, 1979) is an American chef and reality television personality. She was the winner of season 10 of the FOX Network's reality cooking show Hell's Kitchen. She was awarded the position of chef de cuisine at Gordon Ramsay Steak at the Paris Las Vegas. During 2014, Wilson was the executive chef of Gordon Ramsay BurGR at Planet Hollywood Las Vegas. In 2015, she became the corporate executive chef of Gordon Ramsay Restaurant Group. In 2016, and from 2018 to 2023, she returned to Hell's Kitchen as a sous-chef. From 2020 to 2023, she was vice-president culinary at Gordon Ramsay North America.

== Early life and family ==
Wilson is from Phillipsburg, New Jersey, and in 1997 graduated from Phillipsburg High School, where she played field hockey, basketball, and softball. She has three brothers and was inspired to cook by her grandmother. Wilson is openly lesbian.

Wilson earned a basketball scholarship to West Chester University in Pennsylvania but lost the scholarship and waited tables to pay tuition. She transferred to Temple University, graduating with a B.A. in English and Language Arts in 2007.

== Career ==
Wilson never attended culinary school, but instead got her start working at McDonald's as a summer job in high school. She cites her first major cooking experience as a job at West Chester Country Club in West Chester, Pennsylvania, where she "begged to be allowed in the kitchen to learn." While attending Temple University in Philadelphia, she began working in city restaurants. Prior to her win on Hell's Kitchen in 2012, she was chef de cuisine at Lolita BYOB in Philadelphia. She underwent a six-week training course to prepare for her job at Gordon Ramsay Steak in Las Vegas.

In 2014, Wilson left the Paris Las Vegas Gordon Ramsay Steak to become head chef of the Gordon Ramsay BurGR (rebranded as Gordon Ramsay Burger in 2017) next door at the Planet Hollywood Las Vegas.

In 2015, Wilson oversaw the American division of the Gordon Ramsay Restaurant Group as culinary director, which comprised 10 restaurants at the time.

From October 2020 to December 2023, Wilson was the vice president of culinary for Gordon Ramsay North America. She made appearances on many subsequent Hell’s Kitchen seasons following her initial run, being the red team Sous-chef on seasons 15, 17, 18, 19, 20, 21 and 22. She also made appearances on Gordon Ramsay's 24 Hours to Hell and Back, The F Word, and MasterChef Junior. Additionally, in 2017 Wilson hosted a 10-episode YouTube series titled Recipes from Hell's Kitchen.

== See also ==
- List of restaurants owned or operated by Gordon Ramsay
