= Hell's Kitchen (British TV series) =

British TV cookery reality series (2004–2009, 2027)

- Genre: Reality competition
- Created by: Gordon Ramsay
- Presented by: Angus Deayton; Claudia Winkleman
- Starring: Gordon Ramsay; Gary Rhodes; Jean-Christophe Novelli; Marco Pierre White
- Composer: Daniel Pemberton
- Country of origin: United Kingdom
- Original language: English
- No. of series: 4
- No. of episodes: 60

Production
- Production locations: Brick Lane, East London (2004–2005); 3 Mills Studios (2007, 2009)
- Running time: 30–90 mins (inc. adverts)
- Production companies: London Weekend Television (2004); Granada Productions (2004–2006); ITV Productions (2006–2009); Lifted Entertainment (2027); Studio Ramsay Global (2027)

Original release
- Network: ITV
- Release: 23 May 2004 – 27 April 2009
- Release: 2027

Related
- Hell's Kitchen (American TV series); Kitchen Burnout

Hell's Kitchen is a British reality competition cooking show, aired on ITV, which featured prospective chefs competing with each other for a final prize. Four series aired between 23 May 2004 and 27 April 2009, with an upcoming fifth series expected to air in 2027.

Gordon Ramsay, who created the show's format and appeared in the first series as head chef and mentor, did not return for the second due to a busy schedule; Ramsay went on to appear in an American version of the show, which began airing in 2005. Its success helped spawn an international franchise of the same name. For the British version, his initial replacements were fellow chefs Gary Rhodes and Jean-Christophe Novelli, who co-starred in a revamped second series which featured members of the public competing in teams. Following a brief production hiatus, Marco Pierre White took over as head chef for the third and fourth series, which reverted to the original format with a group of celebrities as the contestants. The first three were presented by Angus Deayton, with the fourth and fifth series presented by Claudia Winkleman. The theme music was written by composer Daniel Pemberton.

== Cast ==
Series	Head chefs	Sous chefs	Maître d'hôtel	Presenter
1	Gordon Ramsay	Angela Hartnett; Mark Sargeant	Jean-Philippe Susilovic	Angus Deayton
2	Gary Rhodes; Jean-Christophe Novelli	Adam Gray; Chris Wheeler	Laura Vanninen	Angus Deayton
3	Marco Pierre White	Matthew Brown; Timothy Payne	Nick Munier	Angus Deayton
4	Marco Pierre White	Matthew Brown; Timothy Payne	Nick Munier	Claudia Winkleman
5	Gordon Ramsay	TBA		Claudia Winkleman

== Series overview ==
During its run, the first two series, along with its ITV2 sister show Hell's Kitchen: Extra Portions as well as the 2004 one-off specials Hell's Kitchen: School Reunion and Hell's Kitchen: Coming Out were sponsored by Tío Pepe. In 2007, British furniture and homewares retailer MFI took over as sponsor for the third series.

=== Series 1 (2004) ===
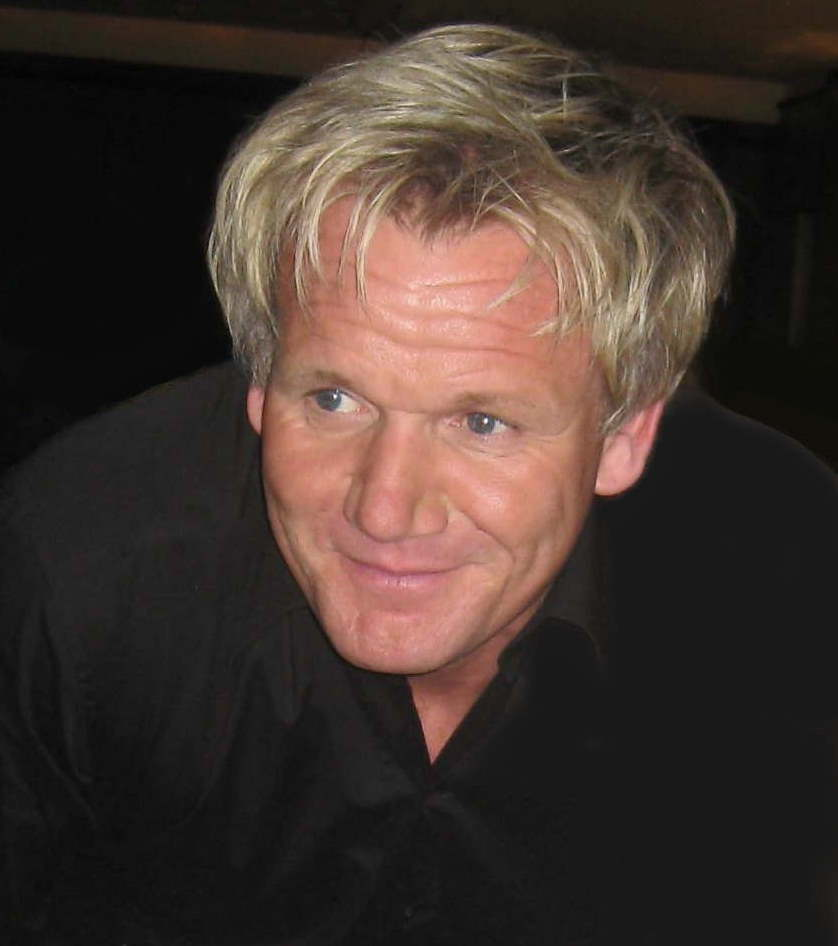
Gordon Ramsay in 2010

The first series of Hell's Kitchen in the UK was broadcast from 23 May to 6 June 2004, airing live nightly for two weeks. The first episode attracted an audience of seven million viewers. The main programme was presented by Angus Deayton. Katie Price (billed under the pseudonym Jordan) and Mark Durden-Smith co-hosted the ITV2 spin-off show. Following the same approach used for I'm a Celebrity, ITV2 provided extra live coverage every evening. The series was also broadcast on TV3 in Ireland.

The premise was head chef Gordon Ramsay teaching ten celebrities how to cook. The celebrities were placed in a temporary, converted warehouse restaurant located within the Old Truman Brewery complex on Brick Lane in east London with the task of catering for a clientele of famous people. Ramsay was assisted by sous chefs Angela Hartnett and Mark Sargeant. The series also featured Jean-Philippe Susilovic, a Belgian maître d'hôtel from Ramsay's London restaurant Pétrus, who was appointed to the same position on the show. Eliminations were determined by a series of public votes (in the style of Big Brother).

Roger Cook was forced to withdraw, before appearing in the live segments, after falling off a chair and injuring his knee during the initial training phase that was aired in the first episode. Two celebrities, Dwain Chambers and Tommy Vance (who replaced Cook), decided to leave the series early in its run. One notorious moment saw Amanda Barrie repeatedly trying to strike Ramsay when she became irate during a heated argument with the head chef. Barrie subsequently decided to quit.

Ramsay was also heavily criticised for comments he made to Edwina Currie referring to her affair with John Major when he was Prime Minister and she was Parliamentary Under-Secretary of State for Health. Ramsay said “You crack me up … One minute you are shagging the prime minister and now you are trying to shag me from behind. You sound like you're going doolally.” Viewers also complained about the chef's choice of language and treatment of the celebrities during the series.

Jennifer Ellison was declared the winner. A follow-up programme was made afterwards called Hell's Kitchen: School Reunion, which saw Ellison and the show runner-up, James Dreyfus, team up to organise a healthy dinner service for the children at Ramsay's former school, Stratford Upon Avon High School and was broadcast in August 2004.

The celebrities who took part were:

No.	Celebrity	Known for	Original Team	Second Team	Status
1	Jennifer Ellison	Actress, model, singer & dancer	Blue Team (Day 1–8)	White Team (Day 9–Final)	Winner
2	James Dreyfus	Actor	Blue Team (Day 1–8)	White Team (Day 9–Final)	Runner-up
3	Matt Goss	Musician	Blue Team (Day 1–8)	White Team (Day 9–Final)	Eliminated (Day 15)
4	Edwina Currie	Former politician	Blue Team (Day 1–8)	White Team (Day 9–13)	Eliminated (Day 14)
5	Al Murray	Comedian & actor	Red Team (Day 1–8)	White Team (Day 9–12)	Eliminated (Day 11)
6	Abi Titmuss	Television personality	Red Team (Day 1–8)	White Team (Day 9)	Eliminated (Day 9)
7	Belinda Carlisle	Musician	Red Team (Day 1–8)	—N/a	Eliminated (Day 8)
8	Amanda Barrie	Actress	Red Team (Day 1–8)	—N/a	Quit (Day 8)
9	Tommy Vance	Radio broadcaster	Red Team (Day 2–5)	—N/a	Quit (Day 5)
10	Dwain Chambers	Retired track sprinter	Blue Team (Day 1–4)	—N/a	Quit (Day 4)
11	Roger Cook	Retired journalist	Red Team (Day 1)	—N/a	Quit (Day 1) (Injury)

=== Series 2 (2005) ===
In July 2004, it was reported that Ramsay would not return as he was unable to devote time to the project. An ITV spokeswoman confirmed this was due to scheduling and time constraints and not as a result of Ramsay signing an exclusivity contract with Channel 4.

The format was overhauled as the show was turned into a competition between two kitchens run by "celebrity chefs" Gary Rhodes and Jean-Christophe Novelli. They were assisted by sous chefs Adam Gray and Chris Wheeler respectively, with Laura Vanninen serving as maitre d'. Deayton returned to present the main programme while Nicole Appleton, as red carpet reporter, and Mark Durden-Smith co-hosted the ITV2 spin-off show.

The second series featured twelve members of the public, who have varying levels of experience in the kitchen, competing for a prize of £250,000 with which the winner could start his or her own restaurant. They were split into two teams of six, one red (tutored by Rhodes) and the other blue (led by Novelli). The red team consisted of Terry Miller, Simon Gross, Aaron Siwoku, Tom Paisley, Caroline Gravy, and Samantha Ramplin; while the blue team included Henry Filloux-Bennett, Aby King, Rory O'Donnell, Gary Tomlin, Kellie Cresswell and Stein Smart who was removed after clashing with Novelli.

A new and much larger restaurant was built to accommodate the fact that there were now two kitchens. The series was again filmed at a converted warehouse in East London. After each service, the diners voted on which team prepared the best food. Elimination remained subject to a public vote, initiated by each head chef nominating a member of their respective team. Filloux-Bennett was the first to be eliminated.

The series was broadcast from 18 April – 2 May 2005 and was won by caterer Terry Miller, with pub chef Kellie Cresswell finishing as runner-up. Rhodes team won the overall team prize for their efforts. Despite drawing a strong peak audience of 6.8 million at launch, the second series failed to match the ratings of the previous celebrity-led series. The series final attracted an audience of 4.8 million, down from the 7.4 million who watched the 2004 final.

Miller used the prize money to launch his Rockafella restaurant in Newcastle’s Amen Corner. The business closed in 2008 due to financial difficulties. In 2013, Miller won a legal dispute against Jay-Z's record label, Roc-A-Fella Records, securing the naming rights for his food brand.

=== Series 3 (2007) ===
The third series was expected to begin in 2006, with Jean-Christophe Novelli reported to appear as the sole head chef; however, ITV made the decision to take a break from producing Hell's Kitchen. Attempts to lure Ramsay back to ITV failed as he signed a new four-year exclusive UK contract with Channel 4, ruling out any possibility of him appearing in future episodes of the show. The network then announced in February 2007 that it had commissioned a new series of the show, to begin later in the year. Michelin starred Marco Pierre White was the new head chef. White had two sous chefs, Matthew Brown and Timothy Payne, and was also joined by Nick Munier as maitre d'.

The new series began on 3 September 2007 at 9:00 pm and reverted to the original format of having celebrities as contestants. The series' debut episode was watched by 3.6 million viewers. Early in the series run, Lee Ryan rowed with White over the chef's use of the term "pikey", and subsequently left the show. Ryan claimed the programme had been edited to look favourable to White. Jim Davidson was asked to leave after using a gay epithet towards fellow contestant Brian Dowling, deemed by producers to be "unacceptable".

The series ended on 17 September 2007, with Barry McGuigan crowned winner. The final, which peaked at 6.3 million, averaged 5.6 million viewers.

The contestants who took part were:

No.	Celebrity	Known for	Original Team	Second Team	Third Team	Status
1	Barry McGuigan	Retired professional boxer	Blue Team (Day 1–14)	Red Team (Day 14-–16)	Blue Team (Day 16–Final)	Winner
2	Adele Silva	Former Emmerdale actress	Red Team (Day 1–14)	Blue Team (Day 14–16)	Red Team (Day 16–Final)	Runner-up
3	Brian Dowling	Television presenter	Blue Team (Day 1–8)	Red Team (Day 8–15)	—N/a	Eliminated (Day 15)
4	Paul Young	Musician	Blue Team (Day 1–14)	Red Team (Day 14–15)	—N/a	Eliminated (Day 15)
5	Anneka Rice	Television presenter	Red Team (Day 1–8)	Blue Team (Day 8–13)	Red Team (Day 13)	Eliminated (Day 13)
6	Abbey Clancy	Lingerie & catwalk model	Red Team (Day 1–7)	Blue Team (Day 7–12)	—N/a	Eliminated (Day 12)
7	Jim Davidson	Stand-up comedian	Blue Team (Day 1–8)	Red Team (Day 8–10)	—N/a	Disqualified (Day 10)
8	Kelly LeBrock	Actress & model	Red Team (Day 1–8)	Blue Team (Day 8–9)	—N/a	Eliminated (Day 9)
9	Rosie Boycott	Retired journalist	Red Team (Day 1–6)	—N/a	—N/a	Eliminated (Day 6)
10	Lee Ryan	Former Blue singer & actor	Blue Team (Day 1–3)	—N/a	—N/a	Walked (Day 3)

=== Series 4 (2009) ===
Series 4 began on 13 April 2009 with Marco Pierre White returning as head chef and teacher. Claudia Winkleman took over as host, replacing Angus Deayton who was dismissed following reports of friction with White during the previous series. Nick Munier returned as Maitre d', as did sous chefs Matthew and Timothy.

As with the previous series, it was filmed at the 3 Mills Studios complex in East London; however this time, there was only one kitchen with grey and dark red tiles and a smaller number of diners. The first three sackings were Marco's responsibility (the fourth did not take place as Grobbelaar decided to voluntarily leave the show in place of the person that was going to be sacked), while the other four sackings were down to a public vote (the person with the lowest number of votes left the show).

Linda Evans won from public voting in the live final on 27 April 2009. Ratings stayed steady at around 4 million throughout the run before peaking at 5.2 million viewers for the finale.

The celebrities who took part were:

No.	Celebrity	Known for	Status
1	Linda Evans	Dynasty actress (1981–89)	Winner (Day 15)
2	Ade Edmondson	Comedian, actor & musician	Runner-up (Day 15)
3	Danielle Lineker (née Bux)	Actress, model & ex-wife of Gary Lineker	Eliminated (Day 13)
4	Niomi McLean-Daley (aka Ms. Dynamite)	Recording artist	Eliminated (Day 12)
5	Anthea Turner	Television presenter	Eliminated (Day 11)
6	Bruce Grobbelaar	Former football goalkeeper	Quit (Day 10)
7	Grant Bovey	Ex-husband of Anthea Turner	Eliminated (Day 9)
8	Jody Latham	Shameless actor	Eliminated (Day 7)

=== Future series ===
The show did not return for a fifth series in 2010; White instead went on to present a new celebrity cooking show for ITV. Kitchen Burnout was largely similar in format, but this time the celebrities worked in a real London restaurant and competed in smaller groups through various stages of the competition until one was crowned the winner.

In June 2020, media reports began to emerge that Ramsay was planning a revival of the UK version. No further updates were issued until April 2024, when it was reported that he was in discussions with ITV. In August 2025, it was revealed that the chef had officially trademarked the show's name earlier in the year specifically so that he could open a string of branded restaurants across the UK. In June 2026, Ramsay confirmed that he was in ongoing talks with ITV; in September, it was first reported that Winkleman was being lined up to return as host. On 20 November 2026, the show's return was confirmed for a 2027 release on ITV, with both Ramsay and Winkleman returning alongside two new sous chefs and a maître d'. Ten celebrity contestants will be challenged to deliver Michelin-standard dishes over a two-week live run, featuring ten hour-long episodes and live public vote-offs.

== International versions ==
Most countries adapt to the American version, airing pre recorded weekly instead of airing live daily, no presenter and just a voiceover, a challenge with the winner earning a reward and the loser doing a punishment, the customers being mostly from the public instead of celebrities with their loved ones and eliminations made by the head chef and not through viewer voting. The Australian, German and Spanish versions were modeled after the British series, where the contestants are celebrities with no professional culinary backgrounds, many may also be complete novices in cooking in general.

Franchise with a currently airing season
Franchise with an upcoming or returning airing season
Franchise no longer in production

Country	Title	Broadcaster	Head Chef	Sous Chefs	Maître	Original run
Albania	Hell's Kitchen Albania	Top Channel	Renato Mekolli	Bleri Dervshi (1); Eri Muhaj (1); Ani Alku (2); Albana Dulellari (2); Francesko Tuku (3); Visara Pirra (3)	Visi (1); Juljan Mata (2)	Season 1: 19 October 2018 – 4 January 2019; Season 2: 11 October 2019 – 10 January 2020; Season 3: 2 October 2020 – 2 January 2021
Australia	Hell's Kitchen Australia	Seven Network	Marco Pierre White	Chris; Andy	Glen	Season 1: 6 August – 5 September 2017
Brazil	Hell's Kitchen - Cozinha Sob Pressão	SBT	Carlos Bertolazzi (1–3); Danielle Dahoui (4)	Alex Caputo (1–2); Zi Saldanha (3–4); Gilda Maria Bley (3–4)	Dídio Perini (1)	Season 1: 11 October 2014 – 10 January 2015; Season 2: 25 April – 18 July 2015; Season 3: 31 October 2015 – 30 January 2016; Season 4: 3 September – 17 December 2016
Bulgaria	Hell's Kitchen България	NOVA TV	Viktor Angelov	Milena Dimova (1–3); Lyuben Koychev (1–3); Veselina Chileva (4); Dani Spartak (4); Svetlana Ilieva (5–); Nikola Simeonov (5–)		Season 1: 27 February – 24 May 2018; Season 2: 26 February – 30 May 2019; Season 3: 25 February – 21 May 2020; Season 4: 25 February – 22 May 2022; Season 5: 20 February – 16 May 2023; Season 6: 20 February – 16 May 2024; Season 7: 10 February – 14 May 2025; Season 8: 17 February – 14 May 2026; Season 9: 2027
Croatia	Hell's Kitchen Hrvatska	RTL	Tomislav Gretić	Ivan Vrbanec; Ivana Bekavac	Unknown	Season 1: 31 January – 15 June 2024
Czech Republic	Na nože!	TV Prima	Zdeněk Pohlreich	Eva Filipová; Roman Vaněk		Season 1: 7 September – 21 December 2010
Czech Republic	Hell’s Kitchen Česko	TV Nova	Radek Kašpárek (1); Jan Punčochář (2–)	David Viktorin; Eliška Hromková	Tomáš Kubíček	Season 1: 28 August – 17 December 2024; Season 2: 27 August 2025 – present
Denmark	Helvedes Køkken (season 1); Hell’s Kitchen Danmark (season 2)	TV 2 (season 1); TV3 (season 2); Viaplay (season 2)	Wassim Hallal (season 1); Jakob Mielcke (season 2)			16 March – 26 May 2010; 26 August 2010 – 2020
Finland	Hell's Kitchen	MTV3	Sauli Kemppainen	Kira Weckman; Tero Laukkanen	Nina Koiranen	Season 1: 20 September – 13 December 2013
France	Hell's Kitchen. Les cuisines de l'enfer	NT1	Arnaud Tabarec			Season 1: 14 January – 18 February 2016
Germany	Teufels Küche	RTL	Christian Rach	Miguel		Season 1: 8 – 21 April 2005
Germany	Hell's Kitchen	Sat.1	Frank Rosin	Michael	Gerhard Retter	Season 1: 7 May – 11 June 2014
Greece	Hell's Kitchen Greece	ANT1	Ectoras Bottrini	Nikos Mpilli; Konstantina Diboli		Season 1: 5 March – 24 June 2018
Indonesia	Hell's Kitchen Indonesia	SCTV	Juna Rorimpandey	Rano Abryanto; Winnie Kusumawardani	Andrie Khusyi	Season 1: 3 January – 8 August 2015
Israel	HaMitbakh	Channel 2	Ezra Kedem			Season 1: 2008
Italy	Hell's Kitchen Italia	Sky Uno; TV8	Carlo Cracco	Entiana Osmenzeza (1); Omar Allievi (1); Marion Lichtle (2); Misha Sukyas (2); Sybil Carbone (3–5); Mirko Ronzoni (3–5)	Luca Cinacchi	Season 1: 17 April – 5 June 2014; Season 2: 21 May – 9 July 2015; Season 3: 4 October – 22 November 2016; Season 4: 3 October 2017 – 21 November 2018; Season 5: 6 November – 21 December 2018
Lithuania	Pragaro Virtuvė	BTV	Liutauras Čeprackas			Season 1: 17 September 2012
Poland	Hell’s Kitchen. Piekielna kuchnia	Polsat	Wojciech Modest Amaro (1–5); Michał Bryś (6); Mateusz Gessler (7–8)	Piotr Ślusarz (1–2); Dariusz Kuźniak (1–2); Piotr Ogiński (3); Paulina Sawicka (3); Sebastian Olma (4–5); Marcin Przybysz (4–5); Łukasz Budzik (6); Marcin Piotrowski (6); Robert Kondziela (7–8); Bartłomiej Krężel (7); Martin Gimenez Castro (8)	Paweł Gruba (1–6); Łukasz Henryk Sagan (7–8)	Season 1: 8 April – 10 June 2014; Season 2: 9 September – 18 November 2014; Season 3: 10 March – 12 May 2015; Season 4: 8 September – 10 November 2015; Season 5: 1 March – 3 May 2016; Season 6: 6 September – 22 November 2016; Season 7: 31 August – 2 November 2022; Season 8: 1 March – 26 April 2023
Portugal	Hell's Kitchen Portugal	SIC	Ljubomir Stanisic	Hugo Nascimento; Manuel Maldonado	Miguel Santos	Season 1: 14 March – 6 June 2021; Season 2: 2 January – 20 March 2022
Portugal	Hell's Kitchen Famosos Portugal Original	SIC	Ljubomir Stanisic	Hugo Nascimento; Manuel Maldonado	Miguel Santos	Season 1: 8 October – 10 December 2023; Season 2: 6 October – 15 December 2024
Romania	Hell's Kitchen – Iadul bucătarilor	Antena 1	Sorin Bontea; Florin Dumitrescu; Cătălin Scărlătescu	Mimi Nicolae; Alex Petricean "D'Artagnan"	Virgil Mănescu	Season 1: 22 September – 22 December 2014; Season 2: 9 March – 4 May 2015
Russia	Адская Кухня	REN TV	Aram Mnatsakanov	Vladimir Yaroslavsky; Jerome Laurier	Sergey Gusovsky	Season 1: 9 February – 31 May 2012; Season 2: 17 January – 25 April 2013
Russia	Адская Кухня	Friday!	Konstantin Ivlev	Yana Pershina (1); Ilya Zakharov (1); Olga Medvedeva (2); Vladimir Bektemirov (2); Elena Savchuk (3); Kirill Berger (3); Andrey Sulima (3, 5); Regina Boginskaya (4); Vladislav Korpusov (4)	Elena Letuchaya (1); Artyom Korolyov (1–4); Mikael Aramian (5)	Season 1: 20 September – 27 December 2017; Season 2: 22 August – 12 December 2018; Season 3: 21 August – 18 December 2019; Season 4: 19 August – 23 December 2020; Season 5: 18 August – 22 December 2021
Spain	Esta cocina es un infierno	Telecinco	Sergi Arola (Black Team); Mario Sandoval (White Team)			Season 1: 9 February – 23 March 2006
Thailand	Hell's Kitchen Thailand	Channel 7	Willment Leong; Kwantip Devakula; Ian Kittichai; Natawoot Thammaphan	Pruek Sumpantaworaboot; Teerapat Tiyasuntaranon		Season 1: 4 February – 19 May 2024; Season 2: 21 September 2025 - 21 December 2025
Ukraine	Пекельна Кухня	1+1	Aram Mnatsakanov	Volodymyr Yaroslavskyi; Jerome Laurier	Serhiy Husovskyi	Season 1: 13 April – 20 July 2011; Season 2: 11 January – 11 March 2012; Season 3: 4 April – 12 July 2013
Ukraine	Пекельна Кухня	Novyi Kanal	Alex Yakutov	Olena Zhabotynska; Mykyta Yefanov	Serhiy Sereda	Season 1: 6 September – 29 December 2021
United States	Hell's Kitchen	Fox	Gordon Ramsay	Scott Leibfried (1–10); James Avery (11–14, 23–); Aaron Mitrano (15–16); Jocky Petrie (17–18); Jason Santos (19–22); Mary Ann Salcedo (1–3); Gloria Felix (4–5); Heather West (6); Andi Van Willigan (7–14, 16); Christina Wilson (15, 17–22); Michelle Tribble (23–)	Jean-Philippe Susilovic (1–7, 11–12); James Lukanik (8–10); Marino Monferrato (13–)	Season 1: 30 May – 1 August 2005; Season 2: 12 June – 14 August 2006; Season 3: 4 June – 13 August 2007; Season 4: 1 April – 8 July 2008; Season 5: 29 January – 14 May 2009; Season 6: 21 July – 13 October 2009; Season 7: 1 June – 10 August 2010; Season 8: 22 September – 15 December 2010; Season 9: 18 July – 19 September 2011; Season 10: 4 June – 10 September 2012; Season 11: 12 March – 25 July 2013; Season 12: 13 March – 24 July 2014; Season 13: 10 September – 17 December 2014; Season 14: 3 March – 9 June 2015; Season 15: 15 January – 29 April 2016; Season 16: 23 September 2016 – 2 February 2017; Season 17: 29 September 2017 – 2 February 2018; Season 18: 28 September 2018 – 8 February 2019; Season 19: 7 January – 22 April 2021; Season 20: 31 May – 13 September 2021; Season 21: 29 September 2022 – 9 February 2023; Season 22: 28 September 2023 – 25 January 2024; Season 23: 26 September 2024 – 6 February 2025
