= Chris Wheeler (chef) =

English chef (1973–2026)

Chris Wheeler (16 June 1973 – c. 5 March 2026) was a British chef.

== Life and career ==
Wheeler was born in Swanage, Dorset in 1973. He started his career at the Domaine De Bassible Hotel and Michelin-starred restaurant in the French town of Segos. He worked with Jean-Christophe Novelli for 10 years, becoming the youngest sous chef in a Michelin-starred restaurant. Wheeler progressed to group head chef with Four Seasons Hotels and Resorts in Park Lane, Le Provence, Lymington, Maison Novelli and Les Saveurs, Mayfair.

In 2003 he joined Stoke Park Country Club, Spa and Hotel in 2003, and was head chef at Humphrey's three–AA Rosette restaurant.

In July 2018, Wheeler released his debut cook book The Ginger Chef 'Served Up'.

Wheeler's death was announced on 5 March 2026.

== Television work ==
| Year | Channel | TV appearances |
|---|---|---|
| 2005 | ITV | Hell's Kitchen |
| 2013 | BBC 1 | Put Your Menu Where Your Mouth Is |
| 2014 | BBC 2 | Saturday Kitchen |
| 2014 | Channel 4 | Sunday Brunch |
| 2016 | BBC 2 | Great British Menu |

== Awards and accolades ==
| Awards | Publication |
|---|---|
| Best Local Menu, 2014 | Berkshire Life Food and Drinks Awards |
| Hotel Chef of the Year (Over 250 Covers), 2016 | Hotel Cateys |
| Fine Dining Restaurant of the Year for Humphry's, 2016 | Buckinghamshire Food and Drinks Awards |
| Chef of the Year, 2016 | Berkshire Life Food and Drinks Awards |

== In the press ==
Chris Wheeler featured on occasion in OK! and Hello! with featured recipes and interviews. He wrote a monthly food column for the Buckinghamshire Advertiser showcasing his favourite "at-home" recipes along with tips, flavours and flares of cooking.
