= Hell's Kitchen Albania =

- Also known as: Kuzhina e Djallit
- Genre: Reality competition
- Created by: Gordon Ramsay
- Directed by: Olsa Muhameti (1, 3); Zefina Hasani (2)
- Presented by: Renato Mekolli
- Country of origin: Albania
- Original language: Albanian
- No. of series: 3
- No. of episodes: 39

Production
- Production location: Tirana
- Running time: 100–120 minutes

Original release
- Network: Top Channel
- Release: 19 October 2018 – 2 January 2021

Hell's Kitchen Albania (also known as Kuzhina e Djallit) is an Albanian cooking reality competition television series based on the British series of the same name. It premiered on Top Channel on 19 October 2018 and ended after three seasons on January 2, 2021. The show was hosted by Albanian chef Renato Mekolli.

== Format ==
The Albanian format reflects the American version. Two teams of aspiring chefs, equally divided between men and women, challenge tests with cooking and table service at the restaurant Hell's Kitchen Albania, supervised and judged by chef Renato Mekolli. A key feature of the program is the psychological pressure to which chef Renato submits competitors; in fact, he does not hesitate to turn to them using particularly offensive insults and epithets, to criticize or scold them, get them to work more efficiently, or even to drive them out of the kitchen.

Each season opens with competitors, always divided between men and women, presenting to a dish to chef Renato, in an attempt to showcase their talents. Starting next episode, the first part of each episode consists of a challenge between the two teams (when there are fewer competitors, these challenges become individual.) In the final stage the colors of the two jackets disappear, to make room for the coveted black jackets. Whoever wins these challenges (which can also occur externally) is rewarded with a particularly entertaining or relaxing excursion. The losers, however, remain at Hell's Kitchen, or in a place outside, to serve a punishment consisting of very tiring, and, in some cases, humiliating, labor. The result of these tests, however, has no influence on what will be the final judgment of the episode.

In the second part of the episode, the contestants have to cook the dishes for restaurant customers (about 60), half of which are served by the blue team and the other half by the red, and Renato check their quality. Based on the work done, Renato decides which of the two teams was the worst, or both teams might be losers. Among either or both teams, Renato will choose a chef who stood out positively over the others; they will be requested to nominate two teammates, including themselves. Renato will choose who will be eliminated from the game. However, it is also possible that Renato decides not to take these into account at time of nomination; he may eliminate competitors who have not been appointed, even those who belonged to the winning team, by virtue of their poor performance or inappropriate behavior. Similarly, competitors may be directly disposed of during the evening service, while in other cases no one is eliminated.

Chef Renato Mekolli runs the kitchen with the help of two sous-chefs: Bleri Dervshi and Eri Muhaj in the first season, Albana Dulellari and Ani Alku in the second season, Francesko Tuku and Visara Pirra in the third season.

== Cast ==
Cast member	Season		
Cast member	1	2	3
Host
Renato Mekolli	Main	Main	Main
Sous Chefs
Blue Team
Bleri Dervshi	Main		
Albana Dulellari		Main	
Visara Pirra			Main
Red Team
Eri Muhaj	Main		
Ani Alku		Main	
Francesko Tuku			Main
Maître d'hôtel
Visi	Main		
Juljan Mata		Main	

== Seasons ==
Season	Original run			Winner	Runner-up	No. of contestants	No. of episodes	Winner's prize
Season	First aired	Last aired	Network	Winner	Runner-up	No. of contestants	No. of episodes	Winner's prize
1	October 19, 2018	January 4, 2019	Top Channel	Ervin Mahilaj	Sileon Thana	15	12	Umami restaurant by Renato Mekolli
2	October 11, 2019	January 10, 2020	Top Channel	Francesko Tuku	Visara Pirra	18	13	Umami restaurant by Renato Mekolli
3	October 2, 2020	January 2, 2021	Top Channel	Erkiada Konci	Donald Shena	18	14	Umami restaurant by Renato Mekolli
