= Jean-Philippe Susilovic =

Belgian-British television personality

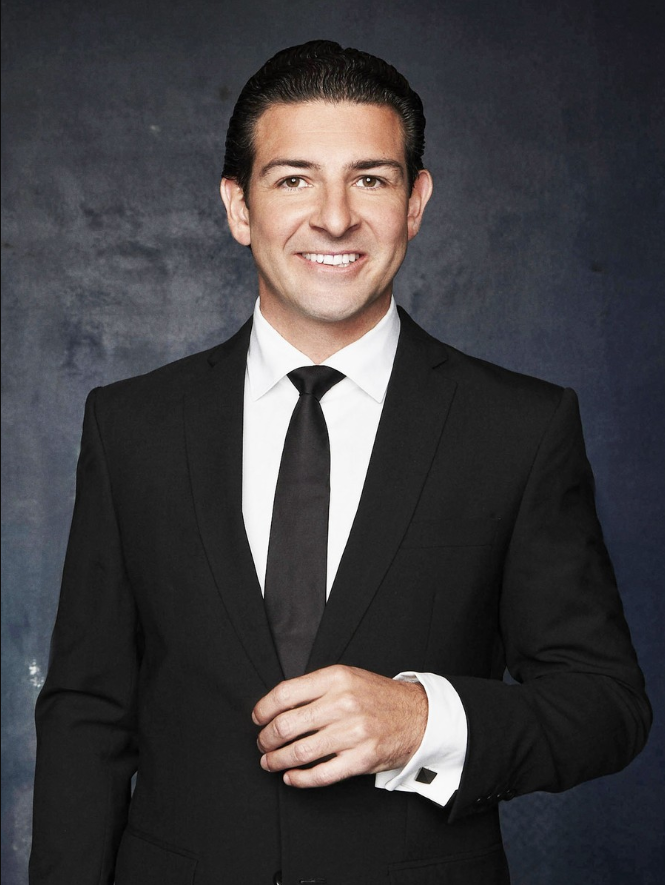
- Official portrait, 2013
- Born: November 26, 1975 (age 50); Brussels, Belgium
- Citizenship: Belgium; United Kingdom
- Occupations: Television personality; restaurant director; maître d'hôtel

Jean-Philippe Susilovic (born November 26, 1975) is a Belgian-British television personality and restaurant director. He is best known for his appearances as the maître d'hôtel (head waiter) on the American version of Gordon Ramsay's reality cooking show Hell's Kitchen, which he appeared on the show's first seven seasons, later on season 11 and 12, and was also the maître d'hôtel for the first series of the original British version of the show.

== Career ==
Susilovic met Ramsay when he was 17 and Ramsay was 25. He has been described by one executive chef as the ideal person to be the maître d'hôtel for Hell's Kitchen. He is said to be and represent the "quintessential" maître d'hôtel.

Susilovic joined Ramsay in 1995, working in Ramsay's restaurant Aubergine. His experience in Michelin-starred restaurants broadened when he moved to the United States to work in restaurants such as New York's La Panetiere, Danube, and Daniel. In October 2001, he moved to the Middle East to work with Ramsay as the manager of Verre at the Hilton Dubai Creek. In 2010, he returned to serve as the maître d'hôtel at Ramsay's re-opened Pétrus. He was the maître d'hôtel for five years at Pétrus in the Berkeley, and moved over with the restaurant to the new location.

Susilovic left the American Hell's Kitchen show following the seventh season due to his commitment as restaurant director at Ramsay's London restaurant Pétrus. Susilovic returned to the show for seasons 11 and 12 but again left before filming began on season 13. He is a recurrent and popular part of the cast, known for his humorous personality and commitment to his job.

== Personal life ==
In 2005, Susilovic fell 50 feet (15 m) from an outside ledge of his apartment building and broke his back while trying to gain entry to his flat.

Along with his native French, Susilovic speaks English and Dutch.

Currently Susilovic owns and runs a restaurant with his wife Daorung Kaenphutsa (a.k.a. Chef Juen) in Ostend, Belgium called Kiss the Chef.
