= Hell's Kitchen Suomi =

Finnish cooking television series

- Genre: Reality television
- Created by: Gordon Ramsay
- Starring: Sauli Kemppainen
- Country of origin: Finland
- Original language: Finnish
- No. of seasons: 1
- No. of episodes: 4

Production
- Running time: 42 minutes
- Production company: ITV Studios Nordic

Original release
- Network: MTV3
- Release: 20 September – 13 December 2013

Related
- Hell's Kitchen (American TV series)

Hell's Kitchen Suomi is the Finnish adaption of British reality show Hell's Kitchen that was created by Gordon Ramsay, who was also the head chef. Top Chef Sauli Kemppainen is the head chef. The series started airing on 20 September 2013 on MTV3. This version stays true to the American version with the participants and the customers not being celebrities, with the broadcast recorded weekly instead of being broadcast live nightly, with no presenter and just a voice-over, with a challenge in which the winner wins a reward and the loser faces a punishment. After dinner service, Kemppainen names a winning team while the losing team nominates two of its team members for elimination to be decided by Kemppainen instead of the viewing public.

== Seasons ==
Season	Original run	Winner	Runner-up	Reason for winning	Contestants	Winner's prize
1	20 September 2013 – 13 December 2013	Erik Mansikka	Sarah Moussabih	Excess	14	An opportunity to cook at Hotel Kämp under the direction of Sauli Kemppainen; A €25,000 cash prize
