= Hell's Kitchen Albania season 2 =

Reality show

Hell's Kitchen Albania
- Season 2
- Hosted by: Renato Mekolli
- No. of contestants: 18
- Winner: Francesko Tuku
- Runner-up: Visara Pirra
- Location: Studio Nova, Tirana, Albania
- No. of episodes: 13

Release
- Original network: Top Channel
- Original release: October 11, 2019 – January 10, 2020

Season chronology
- ← Previous; Season 1 Next → Season 3

The second season of the Albanian competitive reality television series Hell's Kitchen Albania premiered on October 11, 2019, on Top Channel. Renato Mekolli returned as host and head chef. Contestant from season 1, Ani Alku and contestant from MasterChef Albania, Albana Dulellari became the sous chefs for the Red Team and Blue Team respectively. This year maitre d' was Juljan Mata.

On January 10, 2020, chef Renato announced Françesko Tuku as the winner.

== Chefs ==
Contestant	Age	Occupation	Result
Francesko Tuku	24	Chef	Winner
Visara Pirra	21	Chef	Runner-up
Kristina Goro	21	Actress	Eliminated in Finals
Ledjon Malo	28	Chef	Eliminated in Finals
Sokol Luca	25	Chef	Eliminated in Finals
Selman Haxhiu	29	Chef	Eliminated in Finals
Marsela Gengo	27	Lawyer	Eliminated after 12th Service
Rezart Carcia	27	Electrician	Eliminated after 10th Service
Meridiani Helmi	28	Chef	Eliminated after 9th Service
Albina	20	Chef	Eliminated after 8th Service
Livia Piro	23	Chef	Eliminated after 7th Service
Vjonis Alushaj	23	Chef	Eliminated during the 5th Service
Amarilda Llapanji	35	Chef	Eliminated after 4th Service
Ardit Cela	30	Chef	Left before 4th Service
Megi Dalipi	18	Student	Eliminated after 2nd Service
Zamir Karpuzi	31	Chef	Eliminated during the 2nd team challenge
Lirie Ramadani	37	Lawyer	Eliminated not chosen
Klodian Neli	30	Chef	Eliminated not chosen

== Contestant progress ==
		Original teams		With Sokol			With Albina, Selman, Meridiani			Switched Teams					Individuals	Finals
No.	Chef	201	202	203	204	205	206	207		208	209	210	211	212	213	
1	Francesko	IN	WIN	WIN	LOSE	LOSE	NOM (Note: Chef Renato didn't eliminate anyone during nomination.)	WIN	WIN	LOSE	LOSE	LOSE	IN	LOSE	IN	WINNER
2	Visara	IN	LOSE	LOSE	LOSE	LOSE	LOSE	LOSE	LOSE	LOSE	NOM	LOSE	IN	WIN	IN	RUNNER-UP
3	Kristina	IN	LOSE	LOSE	LOSE	NOM	NOM	LOSE	LOSE	LOSE	NOM	LOSE	IN	BoB	OUT	
3	Selman	(Note: Chef was not in competition)					LOSE	LOSE	LOSE	NOM	LOSE	NOM	IN	LOSE	OUT	
3	Ledjon	IN	WIN	WIN	LOSE	LOSE	LOSE	WIN	WIN	LOSE	NOM	NOM	NOM	(Note: Chef Renato picked Ledjon on episode 11 as the first finalist)	OUT	
3	Sokol			WIN	NOM	NOM	LOSE	WIN	WIN	LOSE	LOSE	NOM	IN	NOM	OUT	
7	Marsela	IN	LOSE	LOSE	LOSE	LOSE	LOSE	LOSE	LOSE	LOSE	NOM	NOM	NOM	OUT		
8	Rezart	NOM (Note: Chef was not a regular contestant)	WIN	WIN	LOSE	NOM	LOSE	WIN	WIN	LOSE	LOSE	OUT				
9	Meridiani						LOSE	WIN	WIN	LOSE	OUT					
10	Albina						LOSE	LOSE	NOM	OUT						
11	Livia	IN	LOSE	LOSE	LOSE	LOSE	LOSE	LOSE	OUT							
12	Vjonis	IN	WIN	WIN	LOSE	LOSE	OUT (Note: Eliminated during service after swearing at Chef Renato.)									
13	Amarilda	NOM	LOSE	NOM	NOM	OUT										
14	Ardit	IN	WIN	WIN	LOSE	LEFT										
15	Megi	IN	LOSE	OUT												
16	Zamir	IN	OUT (Note: Eliminated during the team challenge after using minced flour in shrimp batter and undercooking it.)													
17	Lirie	OUT														
17	Klodian	OUT														

Keywords

- WIN = Won the dinner service
- LOSE = Lost the dinner service
- BoB = Best of the Best, usually exempt from nomination
- BoW = Best of the Worst, sometimes exempt from nomination
- IN = not nominated for elimination
- NOM = nominated for elimination
- OUT = eliminated normally
- LEFT = withdrew from competition
- HOSP = eliminated due to hospitalization
- EJEC = eliminated during service

Color key
Chef was eliminated after regular nomination
Chef was eliminated after Ramsay's nomination
Chef was eliminated without nomination
Chef was eliminated from winning team
Chef was eliminated in the Cook For Your Life challenge
Chef was nominated to participate in the Cook For Your Life challenge
Chef was eliminated during service
Chef withdrew from the competition
Chef was the Best of the Best/Worst
Chef was retained after regular nomination
Chef was retained after Ramsay's nomination
Chef's nomination was voided
The winner of Hell's Kitchen
The runner-up of Hell's Kitchen

== Team captains ==
Week #	Captains	
Week #	Team Red	Team Blue
1	No Captain	
2^{1}	Megi	Francesko
3^{2}	Kristina	Ardit
4^{2}	Visara	Vjonis
5^{3}	Livia	Rezart
6^{2}	Marsela	Sokol
7^{2}	Kristina	Francesko
8^{2}	Albina	Selman
9^{2}	Marsela	Ledjon
10	No Captain	
11^{2}	Marsela	Ledjon
12^{2}	Visara	Sokol
13	No Captain	
14	No Captain	

^1 The red team decide the captain for the blue team and the blue team decide the captain for the red team.

^2 Chef Renato decide the captains.

^3 Each team select their captains.
