= Hell's Kitchen Albania season 1 =

Hell's Kitchen Albania
- Season 1
- Hosted by: Renato Mekolli
- No. of contestants: 15
- Winner: Ervin Mahilaj
- Runner-up: Sileon Thana
- No. of episodes: 12

Release
- Original network: Top Channel
- Original release: October 19, 2018 – January 4, 2019

Season chronology
- Next → Season 2

The first season of the Albanian competitive reality television series Hell's Kitchen Albania premiered on October 19, 2018 on Top Channel. Renato Mekolli was the host and the head chef. Eri Muhaj and Bleri Dervshi became the sous chefs for the Red Team and Blue Team respectively. Maitre d' was Visi.

On January 4, 2019, chef Renato announced Ervin Mahilaj as the winner.

== Chefs ==
Contestant	Age	Occupation	Result
Ervin Mahilaj	36	Consultant	Winner
Sileon Thana	24	Assistant Chef	Runner-up
Elvana Canga	36	Chef	Eliminated in Finals
Brunilda Meshau	36	Chef	Eliminated in Finals
Limone Biduli	44	Chef	Eliminated after 10th Service
Erjon Gjergji	39	Economist	Eliminated after 9th Service
Suzana Metaj	25	Household	Eliminated after 8th Service
Oligert Dulja	25	Chef	Eliminated after 7th Service
Ramazan	21	Chef	Eliminated after 6th Service
Stiljana Medi	27	Household	Eliminated after 5th Service
Artan Nikollbibaj	28	Chef	Eliminated after 4th Service
Ani Alku	23	Assistant Chef	Eliminated after 3rd Service
Erjon M.	19	Chef	Eliminated after 2nd Service
Klaidi Reka	22	Chef	Eliminated after 2nd Service
Luisi Mollaymeri	21	Chef	Eliminated after 1st Service

== Contestant progress ==
		Original teams		With Oligert, Artan, Ramazan						Individuals			Finals	
No.	Chef	101	102	103	104	105	106	107	108	109	110	111	112	
1	Ervin	LOSE	NOM	WIN	LOSE	WIN	BoB	LOSE	WIN	IN	IN	IN	BoB	WINNER
2	Sileon	LOSE	LOSE	WIN	LOSE	WIN	LOSE	LOSE	NOM	IN	IN	IN	IN	RUNNER-UP
3	Elvana	WIN	WIN	LOSE	WIN	LOSE	LOSE	WIN	LOSE	IN	IN	IN	OUT	
3	Brunilda	WIN	WIN	LOSE	WIN	LOSE	LOSE	WIN	LOSE	NOM	BoB	IN	OUT	
5	Limone	WIN	WIN	LOSE	WIN	LOSE	LOSE	WIN	LOSE	BoB	OUT			
6	Erjon G.	LOSE	LOSE	WIN	LOSE	WIN	LOSE	LOSE	WIN	OUT				
7	Suzana	WIN	WIN	LOSE	WIN	LOSE	NOM	WIN	OUT					
8	Oligert	(Note: Chef was not in competition)		WIN	LOSE	WIN	LOSE	OUT						
9	Ramazan			WIN	LOSE	WIN	OUT							
10	Stiljana	WIN	WIN	LOSE	WIN	OUT								
11	Artan			WIN	OUT									
12	Ani	WIN	WIN	OUT										
13	Erjon M.	LOSE	OUT											
13	Klaidi	LOSE	OUT											
15	Luisi	OUT												

Keywords

- WIN = Won the dinner service
- LOSE = Lost the dinner service
- BoB = Best of the Best, usually exempt from nomination
- BoW = Best of the Worst, sometimes exempt from nomination
- IN = not nominated for elimination
- NOM = nominated for elimination
- OUT = eliminated normally
- LEFT = withdrew from competition
- HOSP = eliminated due to hospitalization
- EJEC = eliminated during service

Color key
Chef was eliminated after regular nomination
Chef was eliminated after Ramsay's nomination
Chef was eliminated without nomination
Chef was eliminated from winning team
Chef was eliminated in the Cook For Your Life challenge
Chef was nominated to participate in the Cook For Your Life challenge
Chef was eliminated during service
Chef withdrew from the competition
Chef was the Best of the Best/Worst
Chef was retained after regular nomination
Chef was retained after Ramsay's nomination
Chef's nomination was voided
The winner of Hell's Kitchen
The runner-up of Hell's Kitchen

== Team captains ==
Week #	Captains	
Week #	Team Red	Team Blue
1–3	No Captain	
4	Brunilda	Oligert
5–12	No Captain	
