= Hell's Kitchen Suomi season 1 =

2013 Finnish television season

The only season of Hell's Kitchen Suomi aired in Finland on MTV3 in 2013. The season was hosted by Sauli Kemppainen. 14 contestants competed to win an opportunity to cook at Hotel Kämp under the direction of Kemppainen and a €25,000 cash prize.

== Contestants ==
Contestant	Age	Occupation	Hometown
Anssi Heikkinen	28	Performing chef	Rautalampi
Arttu Esko	26	Kitchen chef	Uusikaupunki
Eeva Gustafsson	40	Catering chef	Lahti
Elisa Nurmenniemi	26	Station cook	Espoo
Erik Mansikka	27	Fine dine chef	Naantali
Heli Hyvönen	23	Fish station cook	Kerava
Iryna Laakso	35	Learning chef	Lohja
Markku Mutanen	51	Radio and Television cook	Fuengirola, Spain
Pasi Rönkkö	42	Kitchen chef	Helsinki
Pasi Sämpi	40	Restaurant chef	Espoo
Riika Pulli	27	Shift supervisor	Joensuu
Sakari Mattila	24	Banquet chef	Helsinki
Sarah Moussabih	24	Kitchen chef	Pälkäne
Sari Lylyoja	36	Kitchen chef	Kauhajoki

== Contestants progress ==
No.	Chef	1	2	3		4	5	6	7	8	9	10		11
1	Erik	LOSE	WIN	LOSE	WIN	LOSE	LOSE	LOSE	IN	NOM	IN	BoB	IN	WINNER
2	Sarah	LOSE	BoW	WIN	NOM	WIN	WIN	NOM	IN	IN	NOM	IN	IN	RUNNER-UP
3	Pasi R.	BoW	WIN	LOSE	WIN	WIN	WIN	NOM	IN	IN	IN	IN	OUT	
4	Riikka	LOSE	LOSE	WIN	BoW	WIN	WIN	BoW	IN	NOM	IN	OUT		
5	Pasi S.	LOSE	WIN	LOSE	WIN	WIN	WIN	NOM	NOM	NOM	OUT			
6	Sari	LOSE	LOSE	WIN	NOM	BoW	LOSE	NOM	OUT					
7	Sakari	LOSE	WIN	LOSE	WIN	LOSE	LOSE	OUT						
8	Iryna	LOSE	NOM	WIN	LOSE	NOM	OUT							
9	Arttu	LOSE	WIN	NOM	WIN	OUT								
10	Eeva	NOM	LOSE	WIN	LEFT									
11	Markku	NOM	WIN	OUT										
12	Elisa	NOM	OUT											
13	Anssi	OUT												
14	Heli	OUT												

Keywords

- WIN = Won the dinner service
- LOSE = Lost the dinner service
- BoB = Best of the Best, usually exempt from nomination
- BoW = Best of the Worst, sometimes exempt from nomination
- IN = not nominated for elimination
- NOM = nominated for elimination
- OUT = eliminated normally
- LEFT = withdrew from competition
- HOSP = eliminated due to hospitalization
- EJEC = eliminated during service

Color key
Chef was eliminated after regular nomination
Chef was eliminated after Ramsay's nomination
Chef was eliminated without nomination
Chef was eliminated from winning team
Chef was eliminated in the Cook For Your Life challenge
Chef was nominated to participate in the Cook For Your Life challenge
Chef was eliminated during service
Chef withdrew from the competition
Chef was the Best of the Best/Worst
Chef was retained after regular nomination
Chef was retained after Ramsay's nomination
Chef's nomination was voided
The winner of Hell's Kitchen
The runner-up of Hell's Kitchen
