= Pétrus (restaurant) =

Restaurant in London, England

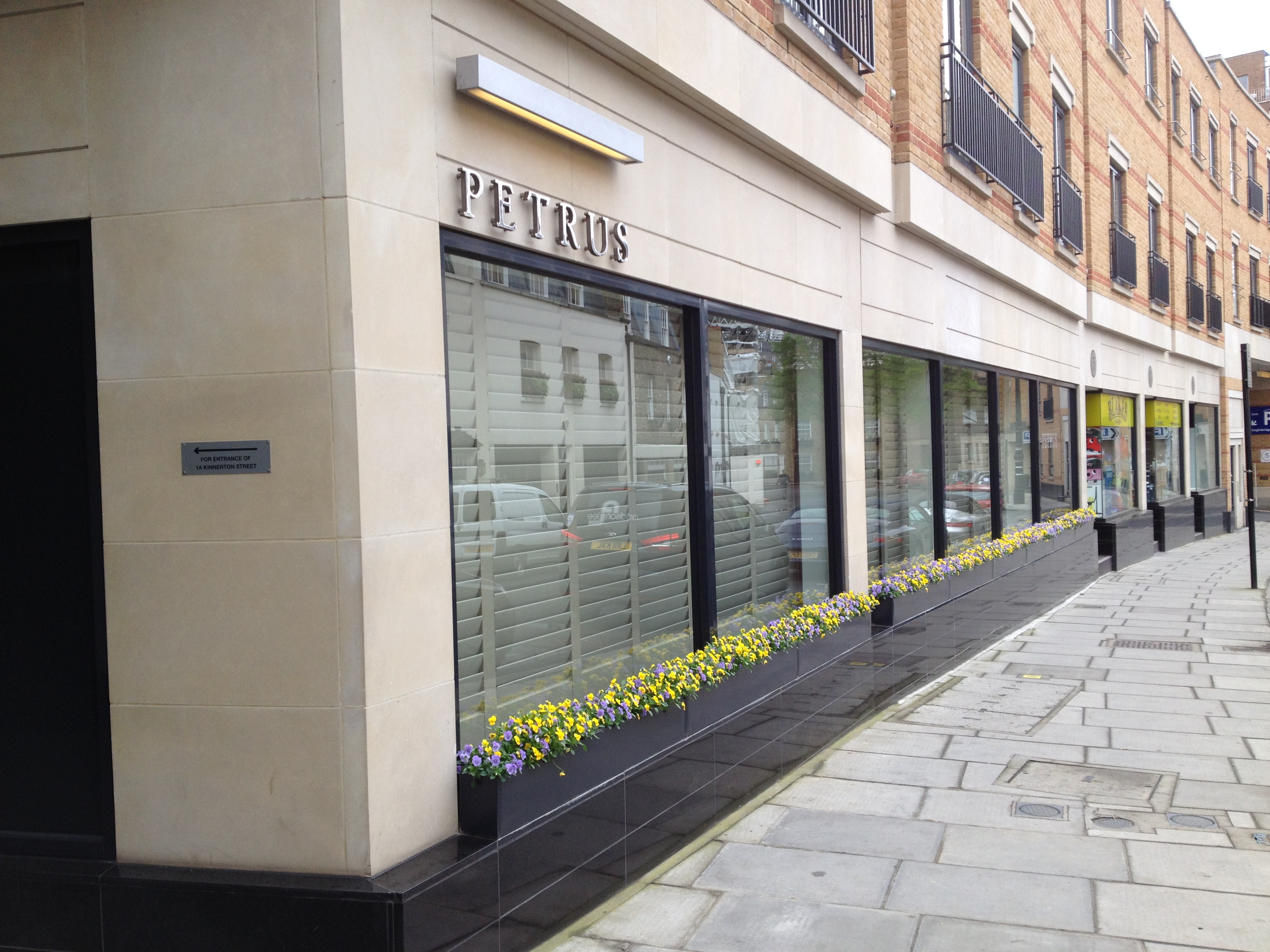
- The exterior of Pétrus, in its second location

- Location in City of Westminster

Restaurant information
- Established: 22 March 1999; 27 years ago
- Owner: Gordon Ramsay Restaurants Limited
- Head chef: Orson Vergnaud
- Chef: Gordon Ramsay
- Food type: French cuisine
- Dress code: Smart jeans accepted, but no sportswear or shorts
- Rating: (Michelin Guide); AA Rosettes (2026)
- Location: Kinnerton Street, Belgravia, London, SW1, United Kingdom
- Coordinates: 51°29′59″N 0°9′23″W
- Seating capacity: 50
- Other information: Nearest station: Knightsbridge
- Website: GordonRamsay.com/...

Pétrus is a restaurant in London, which serves modern French cuisine. It is located in Kinnerton Street, Belgravia and is owned by celebrity chef Gordon Ramsay's Gordon Ramsay Restaurants Ltd. It has held one Michelin star since 2011, and 3 AA Rosettes.

It opened in March 1999 at 33 St James's Street under head chef Marcus Wareing, and moved to The Berkeley hotel in Knightsbridge in 2003. It opened at its current address, 1 Kinnerton Street, in March 2010.

== Description ==
The current Pétrus restaurant is located in 1 Kinnerton Street, Belgravia, London, where it was opened on 29 March 2010 under head chef Sean Burbidge. He had worked in other Gordon Ramsay restaurants including Restaurant Gordon Ramsay and Gordon Ramsay au Trianon, but it is his first position as head chef. The head chef is Russell Bateman, who in 2014 won the National Chef of the Year competition.

The interior of the restaurant was designed by the Russell Sage Studio, who also worked on other Ramsay establishments, The Savoy Grill and the York and Albany. The claret red theme of previous incarnations of the restaurant has been maintained, and was coupled in the design with leather and polished metalwork. The layout includes a chef's table for six people which overlooks the kitchen. The wine list includes more than 2,000 bottles of wine, and includes 34 different vintages of the French wine Pétrus. They are located in a circular glass room located in the middle of the dining room.

=== Menu ===
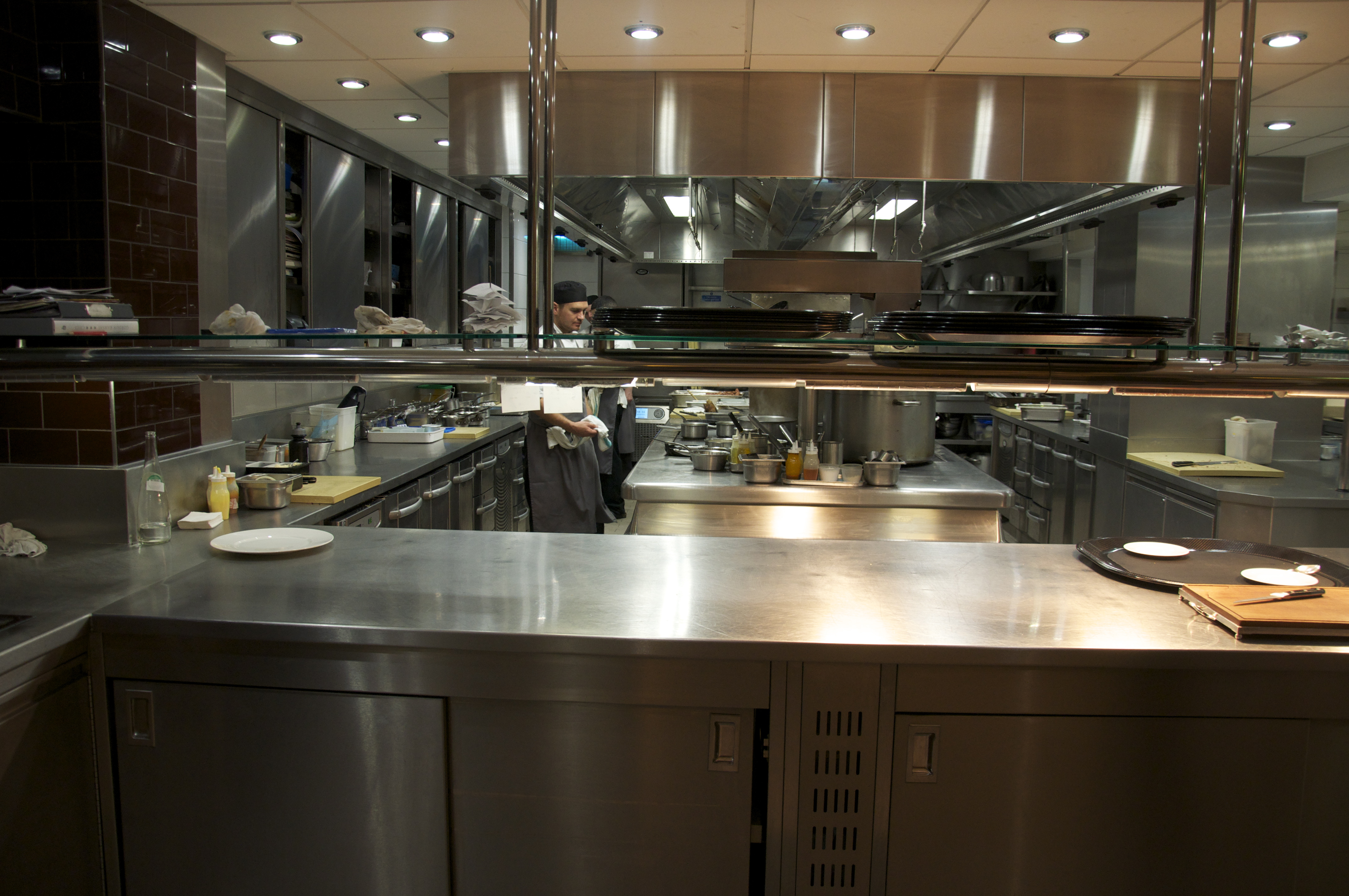
Pétrus' kitchen at 1 Kinnerton Street

The menu at Pétrus is split into several fixed price menus, containing modern French cuisine. It has been described by Zoe Williams as being distinctly Gordon Ramsay in composition, despite the influences of head chef Sean Burbidge. The meals come with an amuse-bouche, a pre-starter course, and after dinner chocolates in addition to the items listed on the menus. A number of pan fried fish dishes have been on the menu, including mackerel with tomato chutney and a niçoise salad, and a sea bream course served with brown shrimp, samphire and an oyster velouté sauce. Further seafood related dishes include a langoustine and watercress soup entrée which was praised by food critic Jay Rayner. Sauces are generally delivered to the table in small jugs and are poured tableside.

Elements of the dessert course are served on dry ice, such as small round white chocolate balls of ice cream, which has been taken from the menu at Restaurant Gordon Ramsay. Other desserts on the menu include a hollow sphere of chocolate, which a hot chocolate sauce is poured over to dissolve the sphere in order to unveil the ball of milk ice cream within, and a fennel crème brûlée served with Alphonso mango. The wine list starts from around £25, and moves up to a 1961 magnum of Pétrus at £49,500.

== History ==
Pétrus began as a joint venture between chef Gordon Ramsay and his father-in-law Chris Hutcheson as Ramsay's second restaurant after Restaurant Gordon Ramsay in Chelsea. It was opened at 33 St James's Street, London, on 22 March 1999 under head chef Marcus Wareing. The name came from the French wine Pétrus, which was Ramsay's and Wareing's favourite.

Giorgio Locatelli allegedly caused criminal damage to the restaurant later in 1999 by spitting at the wallpaper, resulting in an estimated £1,300 worth of damage, but the case was dropped by the Crown Prosecution Service. In July 2001, the expenditure of a group of six investment bankers at Pétrus made national news in the UK. Together they spent more than £44,000 on wine, resulting in the restaurant giving them £400 worth of food gratis.

In 2003, Gordon Ramsay Holdings took over the location previously used by Pierre Koffmann's restaurant La Tante Claire at The Berkeley hotel in Knightsbridge, London. The restaurant was one of those run by Ramsay that he imposed a smoking ban in from 2004 onwards.

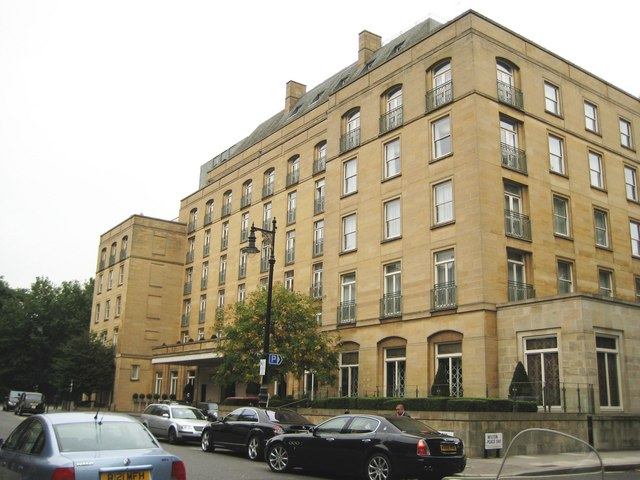
The Berkeley Hotel, Knightsbridge, former home of Pétrus

In May 2008, it was announced that the hotel intended to work directly with Wareing rather than through Gordon Ramsay Holdings, as the lease on Pétrus' location inside the Berkeley Hotel was due to lapse in September 2008. This deal resulted in a public war of words between Wareing and Ramsay, with Wareing opening his restaurant Marcus Wareing at the Berkeley in the space previously occupied by Pétrus, and Ramsay's holding company retaining the rights to the Pétrus name. Wareing described his new venture as being a renaming of Pétrus. Originally it was expected that the name would be transferred to another restaurant already held by the company. A spokesperson for the Michelin Guide stated that Pétrus' Michelin stars would stay with the property, expecting "that things will change very little" when it was reviewed for the 2009 guide. Before Pétrus closed at The Berkeley to be rebranded, all of the potential customers in the reservations book were contacted to say that their reservations had been cancelled and to offer them a place at another Ramsay restaurant.

Wareing later criticised Pétrus when it reopened at 1 Kinnerton Street, and said that while any restaurant could be named after a bottle of wine, the real Pétrus remained his restaurant despite the name change. The new location was near the former premises, but the menu was described as being distinctly "Gordon" rather than "Marcus". Jean-Philippe Susilovic, who was the Maître d'hôtel for five years at Pétrus in the Berkeley, moved over with the restaurant to the new location. Pétrus has a twenty-year lease at Kinnerton Street.

Following the sacking of Hutcheson by Ramsay from Gordon Ramsay Holdings, Hutcheson attempted to take control of Pétrus in its new location as he argued that he had listed himself as sole shareholder of the company "Pétrus (Kinnerton Street)" on the documentation filed with Companies House in April 2010. The issue was settled when Ramsay bought out Hutcheson's stake in Gordon Ramsay Holdings, and transferred the restaurant to Ramsay's new company, Kavalake Limited. In June 2014, Neil Snowball took over from Sean Burbridge as head chef at the restaurant.

== Reception ==
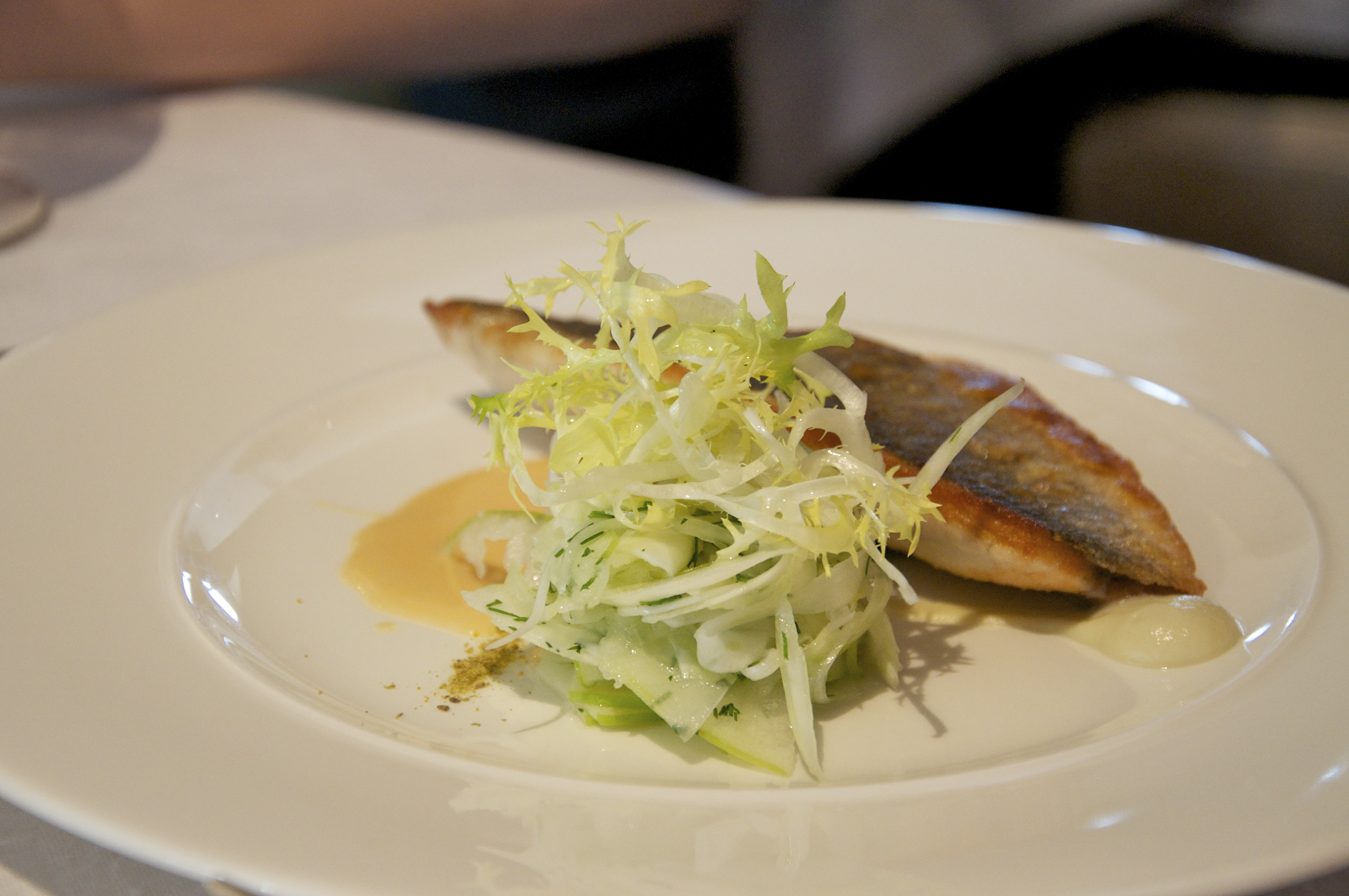
A sea bass main course dish served at Pétrus

Tracey Macleod ate at Pétrus for The Independent shortly after it opened in 1999. She thought that certain touches would impress the Michelin inspectors, and that the dishes were suitably elaborate. Jay Rayner visited the restaurant whilst it was at the Bekerley Hotel in 2003 for The Observer. He thought that the menu was over complicated, and not all the elements of the dishes worked together. Gillian Glover of The Scotsman thought in 2005 that some of the food served was forgettable, but stand out elements included frog leg lollipops which came with her main course of baked seabass with garlic puree.

Zoe Williams reviewed the restaurant for The Daily Telegraph in 2010, after Burbidge became head chef. She found issues with some of the dishes, such as a mackerel which wasn't properly filleted, and some overcooked samphire. However she thought that the dessert was perfect, stating that "It was enough to make you wonder why anybody ever makes custard without fennel". Fay Maschler visited the new establishment in April 2010 for the Evening Standard, who disagreed with the idea that it was a reopening and said that it instead should be considered to be a new Ramsay restaurant. She was impressed by the majority of the food, especially the desserts, however felt that the service was a little alien. Marina O'Loughlin for the Metro in June 2010, thought that the food was fine and although the restaurant seems to have been entirely designed with gathering Michelin stars, it seemed that everything on the menu had been done somewhere else but better. Time Out's review of the restaurant rated it at four out of five stars, being impressed with the quality of the food and describing the wine selection as "crammed with class".

=== Ratings and awards ===
The restaurant won its first Michelin star under Wareing in 2000, and was awarded a second star in 2007. It became only the fifth London based restaurant to hold stars at that level. Following the split with Wareing, the restaurant at the new location gained a new single Michelin star in the 2011 list.

Whilst under Wareing's lead, the restaurant was rated the best overall restaurant in London by restaurant guide Harden's in 2008, but was beaten by Restaurant Gordon Ramsay in the best food and service rankings in the £80+ bracket. However, in 2009, it was ranked once more the best overall in London, and in those categories as well.

It held five AA Rosettes. However, in 2002 editor Simon Wright resigned as he believed that the managing director of The Automobile Association intervened to prevent Pétrus from receiving a fifth rosette at the recommendation of the AA's inspectors. Ramsay reacted by threatening to take legal action in order to ensure that none of his restaurants were featured in the 2003 edition of the AA's restaurant guide. This was followed by the resignation of inspector Sarah Peart over the same issue. The AA eventually relented and awarded Pétrus five rosettes. Wareing said of the issue at the time, "I'm delighted to get the fifth rosette, it's a great achievement. Every AA inspector believed we deserved five rosettes, it was only the guy at the top, Roger Wood, who didn't. As far as I know, he still has not eaten at Pétrus and I would not welcome him here now."
