= Hell's Kitchen (American TV series) season 12 =

Hell's Kitchen
- Season 12
- Region 1 DVD cover
- Hosted by: Gordon Ramsay
- No. of contestants: 20
- Winner: Scott Commings
- Runner-up: Jason Zepaltas
- No. of episodes: 20

Release
- Original network: Fox
- Original release: March 13 – July 24, 2014

Season chronology
- ← Previous; Season 11 Next → Season 13

The twelfth season of the American competitive reality television series Hell's Kitchen premiered on Fox on March 13, 2014, and concluded on July 24, 2014. Gordon Ramsay returned as the host and head chef, Andi Van Willigan returned as the Red Team's sous-chef, James Avery returned as the Blue Team's sous-chef, and Jean-Philippe Susilovic returned as the maître d'.

Executive chef Scott Commings won the season, with sous-chef Jason Zepaltas finishing second.

== Chefs ==
Twenty chefs competed in season 12. Jason Zepaltas previously competed in season 9 but withdrew before the first dinner service after falling ill during prep. He became the second chef to have competed in two seasons, after Robert Hesse from seasons five and six. Until season 17, he was also the only chef to present two signature dishes to Ramsay.

Contestant	Age	Occupation	Hometown	Result
Scott Commings	36	Executive Chef	Woodstock, Illinois	Winner
Jason Zepaltas (Note: Zepaltas first competed in Season 9 of Hell's Kitchen but withdrew in last place due to illness.)	31	Sous Chef	Chicago, Illinois	Runner-Up
Melanie Finch	24	Line Cook	Woodland Hills, California	Eliminated before Finals
Rochelle Bergman	27	Catering Chef	Riverside, California	Eliminated before Finals
Joy Parham–Thomas	25	Kitchen Supervisor	Philadelphia, Pennsylvania	Quit during Fifteenth Service
Kashia Zollicoffer	23	Line Cook	Carthage, Mississippi	Eliminated after Fourteenth Service
Michael Gabriel	26	Executive Chef	Spring, Texas	Ejected during Thirteenth Service
Anton Testino	39	Head Chef	Butler, New Jersey	Eliminated after Twelfth Service
Richard Mancini	48	Executive Chef	Bloomingdale, Illinois	Eliminated after Eleventh Service
Sandra Flores	36	Sous Chef	Queens, New York	Eliminated after Tenth Service
Ralph Johnson	28	Chef de Partie (Line Cook)	Boston, Massachusetts	Eliminated after Eighth Service
Jessica Vogel	30	Line Cook	Spring Lake, New Jersey	Eliminated after Cook for your Life Challenge
Beverly "Bev" Lazo–Gonzalez	42	Food Truck Chef	Whittier, California	Eliminated after Seventh Service
Chris Eversole	27	Line Cook	Las Vegas, Nevada	Eliminated after Sixth Service
Beth Taylor	43	Line Cook	Independence, Louisiana	Eliminated after Fifth Service
Michael DeMarco	29	Line Cook	Scranton, Pennsylvania	Eliminated after Wedding Service
Mike Aresta	38	Chef Instructor	Keyport, New Jersey	Eliminated after Fourth Service
Simone Hammond	43	Buffet Cook	Henderson, Nevada	Quit after Third Service
Nicole Rutz	33	Baker	Morganville, New Jersey	Eliminated after Second Service
Gaurav Navin	34	Executive Chef	East Stroudsburg, Pennsylvania	Eliminated after First Service

== Contestant progress ==
No.	Chef	Original teams											1st switch		2nd switch		Individuals			Finals
No.	Chef	1201	1202	1203	1204	1205	1206	1207	1208	1209/1210		1211	1212	1213	1214	1215/1216	1217	1218	1219	1220
1	Scott	LOSE	LOSE	LOSE	LOSE	LOSE	WIN	NOM	WIN	IN	NOM	NOM	NOM	WIN	NOM	NOM	NOM	IN	IN	WINNER
2	Jason	LOSE	LOSE	LOSE	LOSE	LOSE	WIN	LOSE	WIN	IN	LOSE	LOSE	LOSE	LOSE	WIN	NOM	IN	IN	IN	RUNNER UP
3	Melanie	LOSE	LOSE	LOSE	WIN	WIN	LOSE	WIN	LOSE	IN	WIN	LOSE	LOSE	WIN	WIN	LOSE	IN	IN	OUT	Jason's team
4	Rochelle	LOSE	LOSE	NOM	WIN	WIN	LOSE	WIN	LOSE	IN	WIN	NOM	LOSE	LOSE	WIN	LOSE	IN	IN	OUT	Scott's team
5	Joy	LOSE	LOSE	LOSE	WIN	WIN	LOSE	WIN	LOSE	IN	WIN	LOSE	LOSE	WIN	LOSE	IMM (Note: Joy was immune from elimination)	IN	LEFT		
6	Kashia	LOSE	LOSE	LOSE	WIN	WIN	LOSE	WIN	LOSE	IN	WIN	LOSE	NOM	WIN	LOSE	LOSE	OUT			Scott's team
7	Gabriel	LOSE	NOM	LOSE	LOSE	NOM	WIN	LOSE	WIN	IN	NOM	LOSE	NOM	NOM	WIN	EJEC				Jason's team
8	Anton	LOSE	LOSE	LOSE	LOSE	LOSE	WIN	LOSE	WIN	IN	LOSE	NOM	LOSE	WIN	OUT					Jason's team
9	Richard	LOSE	LOSE	LOSE	LOSE	NOM	WIN	LOSE	WIN	NOM	LOSE	LOSE	LOSE	OUT						
10	Sandra	NOM	LOSE	NOM	WIN	WIN	NOM	WIN	LOSE	IN	WIN	NOM	OUT							Jason's team
11	Ralph	LOSE	LOSE	LOSE	LOSE	LOSE	WIN	NOM	WIN	IN	OUT									Scott's team
12	Jessica	LOSE	LOSE	LOSE	WIN	WIN	LOSE	WIN	NOM	OUT										Scott's team
13	Bev	LOSE	LOSE	LOSE	WIN	WIN	LOSE	WIN	OUT											Jason's team
14	Chris	LOSE	LOSE	NOM	LOSE	LOSE	WIN	OUT												Scott's team
15	Beth	LOSE	NOM	LOSE	WIN	WIN	OUT													
16	DeMarco	NOM	NOM	NOM	NOM	OUT														
17	Mike	LOSE	LOSE	NOM	OUT															
18	Simone	LOSE	NOM	LEFT																
19	Nicole	NOM	OUT																	
20	Gaurav	OUT																		

Keywords

- WIN = Won the dinner service
- LOSE = Lost the dinner service
- BoB = Best of the Best, usually exempt from nomination
- BoW = Best of the Worst, sometimes exempt from nomination
- IN = not nominated for elimination
- NOM = nominated for elimination
- OUT = eliminated normally
- LEFT = withdrew from competition
- HOSP = eliminated due to hospitalization
- EJEC = eliminated during service

Color key
Chef was eliminated after regular nomination
Chef was eliminated after Ramsay's nomination
Chef was eliminated without nomination
Chef was eliminated from winning team
Chef was eliminated in the Cook For Your Life challenge
Chef was nominated to participate in the Cook For Your Life challenge
Chef was eliminated during service
Chef withdrew from the competition
Chef was the Best of the Best/Worst
Chef was retained after regular nomination
Chef was retained after Ramsay's nomination
Chef's nomination was voided
The winner of Hell's Kitchen
The runner-up of Hell's Kitchen

== Episodes ==
No. overall	No. in season	Title	Original release date	U.S. viewers (millions)
167	1	"20 Chefs Compete"	March 13, 2014	5.45
Twenty chefs were taken on a bus to Hell's Kitchen. Chef Ramsay greeted them and mentioned that Los Angeles is known not only for its cuisine, but for its entertainment. Cooks and diners then danced to the show's theme song while Ramsay had the chefs go to the kitchen for their first challenge. The teams were divided up between the women (red team) and the men (blue team). Team challenge/signature dish: The teams had 45 minutes to create competing signature dishes, which were judged by Ramsay. Anton's seared crabmeat-crusted pork chop scored over Simone's pork chop, Jason's seared and braised wild salmon scored over Nicole's halibut (Jason also mentioned his season 9 run which ended very early due to dehydration). Chris's Cornish hen scored over Joy's chilled corn soup, and Kashia's New York strip scored over Mike's herb-fried tortellini. Mike revealed that the tortellini was store-bought, and the sauce was made with canned tomatoes. Ramsay, disgusted, dumped out his dish. When sent back in line, Mike muttered an insult, causing Chef Ramsay to pull him back out and berate him. Melanie's scallops scored over Richard's pan-roasted sea bass, and Bev's fish tacos scored over Gabriel's stuffed chicken breast. Neither Gaurav's tuna steak nor Sandra's pan-seared cod scored a point. Beth's fried catfish scored over DeMarco's ricotta gnocchi, and Ralph's New England lobster scored over Rochelle's sauteed chicken and asparagus. Lastly, Jessica's rosemary-crusted venison loin scored over Scott's fennel-dusted rack of lamb. The women gained a 5–4 win, marking the third consecutive season the women won the signature dish challenge. Reward/punishment: The women had dinner with Ramsay at one of his Los Angeles restaurants while the men prepped both kitchens and cleaned the dining room. Mike walked out on the punishment, angering his teammates since he was responsible for their loss. Service: Chris and Melanie served tableside chicken Caesar salad. In the men's kitchen, Gabriel, DeMarco and Gaurav proved incapable of getting any appetizers out. Gaurav's risottos came out soupy and then peppery, and he only angered Ramsay further by tasting the risotto with his fingers. DeMarco overcooked the lobster tail and Gabriel served scallops seared on only one side. In the women's kitchen, Nicole's lack of knowledge led Joy to take over most of the responsibilities on the fish station; however, Joy overcooked her scallops. Sandra, angered that she had to refire her risotto, refused to communicate properly with Joy and Nicole, while Joy and Sandra repeatedly argued over the latter's lack of communication. This led the women to struggle to time their appetizers correctly, and Ramsay kicked Joy, Nicole, and Sandra out after Joy and Nicole failed to start their lobster tail, even though Sandra's risotto was already at the pass. Both teams were kicked out when both Gabriel and Kashia overcooked scallops. Ramsay noted it as the worst opening service in the show's history, as nothing was served from either kitchen. For the first time since Season 8, both teams lost on opening night, and had to each provide two nominees for elimination. Elimination: The women nominated Sandra and Nicole while the men nominated Gaurav and DeMarco. Ramsay eliminated Gaurav for his poor performance on appetizers (especially for putting his fingers into the risotto) and nonchalant attitude. Gaurav's comment: "I definitely do not think that I'm the worst chef in that group of 20 people, definitely not. I understand that I tasted the food by my fingers, but everybody does it." Ramsay's comment: "There's so many things about India that I love. It's a shame Gaurav isn't one of them."
168	2	"19 Chefs Compete"	March 20, 2014	5.34
The chefs were awakened by bikers performing stunts inside a spherical cage. Team challenge: The chefs worked in pairs in a "chef's relay", where they pedaled tricycles to a cooking area and aimed to finish prepping all five areas first. Since the men had one less member, Gabriel went twice. DeMarco and Richard finished cleaning shrimp before Kashia and Bev; Jessica and Beth finished breaking down chicken before Anton and Chris; Jason and Gabriel passed Melanie and Simone in cleaning oysters; Mike and Scott finished filleting trout before Sandra and Nicole; and Ralph and Gabriel finished making egg-white omelettes before Joy and Rochelle. The men got their first challenge win. Reward/punishment: The men flew to San Francisco, where they had lunch at Epic Roasthouse with Ramsay and rode Segways around the city. The women were sent in a school bus to a farm to pick carrots and make stock upon their return to Hell's Kitchen. During the punishment, Nicole's quiet behavior annoyed Kashia, leading to an argument about the former's lack of passion. Service: Mike and Sandra served tableside oysters, but Mike inadvertently served a couple of the women's tables. In the men's kitchen, Jason served bland risotto and DeMarco cooked tuna, as appetizers, in a cold pan; but both recovered. Scott and Gabriel mixed up cooking times on entrées, and after Scott served raw halibut and Gabriel served raw chicken twice, Ramsay threw the men out. In the women's kitchen, Simone and Nicole failed to serve an acceptable risotto and were thrown out, and though Kashia did well on meat, Beth served raw lobster and raw and overcooked halibut, causing Ramsay to throw the women out. Ramsay again named both teams losers and asked for two nominees apiece. Elimination: The men nominated DeMarco and Gabriel while the women nominated Beth and Simone. However, Ramsay overruled and eliminated Nicole, feeling that her negative attitude and lack of passion, cooking ability, fighting spirit, and leadership outweighed the mistakes made by the four nominees. Nicole's comment: "I'm not gonna cry like a little bitch. I don't give two flying fucks what he thinks and what he says. He can kiss my big fat ass. Bye, Chef Ramsay." Ramsay's comment: "I'm not looking for a line cook. But if I were, I still wouldn't have hired Nicole. She was useless."
169	3	"18 Chefs Compete"	March 27, 2014	5.39
The chefs were awakened by pigs running through the dorms; each chef had to carry a pig outside. Team challenge: The teams had to dig up potatoes in a pen full of farm animals, three chefs at a time, until one team reached 100 pounds. While the men won that part of the challenge, they were then informed that part was not all of it, they also had to create potato dishes. Each team picked five dishes for Ramsay to rate from 1–5. Jessica's sweet potato succotash and Richard's Irish Colcannon both scored 4. Sandra's pancetta sofrito and Ralph's potato salad both scored 3. Jason's potato gratin scored 4 while Bev's potato hash scored 2. Melanie's gnocchi scored 4 while Mike's boulangère scored 1. Lastly, Scott's potato souffle scored 4, but Joy's pierogi scored 5, giving the women an 18–16 victory. Reward/punishment: The women went out to sea on a luxury sailboat. The men had to give the animals baths. During dinner service prep, DeMarco cut himself and was sent to urgent care, while Rochelle and Simone both fell sick; but their team believed Simone was faking. Both women returned in time to start the service. Service: Kashia and Ralph served tableside Steak Diane. Guests in attendance for this service included Senen "Sen Dog" Reyes and EC Twins. Anton and Joy did well on appetizers, but both teams struggled on fish. Simone served a raw lobster tail, and Ramsay found her and Jessica using too much oil for the scallops and putting raw scallops in the same pan as cooked ones. After they served raw scallops and salmon, Ramsay kicked them both out. Chris served halibut with no crust while Mike struggled to communicate with him; and DeMarco, who returned mid-service, served poorly sliced chicken. However, in the women's kitchen, Sandra served perfectly cooked Beef Wellingtons. Ramsay threw the men out when Scott sliced lamb before Chris's halibut was ready, and the women after Bev served raw and overcooked halibut. This was the third service in a row where both teams lost, marking the worst service start in the show's history. For the first time in Hell's Kitchen history, Ramsay had the teams nominate three chefs apiece for elimination, instead of two. Elimination: The women nominated Simone, Rochelle, and Sandra while the men nominated Mike, DeMarco, and Chris. After the nominees were named, Ramsay called for Simone, Mike, and DeMarco to step forward, had them remove their jackets, and gave them ten seconds to plead their cases. When Ramsay was about to announce his decision, Simone immediately volunteered to leave the competition, marking the third voluntary exit at elimination (after Ji-Hyun Cha from Season 5 and Joseph Tinnelly from Season 6). Before sending the chefs back, Ramsay gave DeMarco and Mike back their jackets. Simone's comment: "I'm normally really energetic and lively, and since I haven't been feeling well, I think I've come across as very soft and not someone who can fight. And even the biggest, most wonderful things sometimes don't turn out to be the best for you." Ramsay's comment: "Hell's Kitchen is about making someone's wish come true. Simone wished to leave Hell's Kitchen. That was an easy one. Wish granted."
170	4	"17 Chefs Compete"	April 3, 2014	4.99
Ramsay dumped about 200,000 pennies ($2,000) on the floor to give the chefs a lesson in consistency, representing how much money was wasted last service. He then taught them how to make ravioli. Team challenge: The chefs made ravioli dishes in pairs; the first team to make ten approved dishes would win. The pairs for the women were Melanie and Jessica, Kashia and Sandra, Bev and Rochelle, and Beth and Joy. The pairs for the men were Jason and Scott, Ralph and Richard, Chris and Anton, and DeMarco, Gabriel, and Mike, since the men had an extra member. The men raced to a 6–0 lead, but the women quickly caught up, mainly thanks to Jessica and Melanie. With the teams at a 9–9 tie, DeMarco, Gabriel, and Mike, who struggled, finally submitted a dish, but it was rejected, allowing the women to pass with their tenth dish and win their third challenge. Reward/punishment: The women were rewarded with a day at a mansion in Beverly Hills. The men prepped both kitchens and wrapped the pennies Ramsay dumped. Service: Ramsay announced that this service will host steak night. Beth, Rochelle, Gabriel, and Scott served tableside salad and prime rib. Guests in attendance were Sharon Case, Suzanne Whang, and Vanessa Marcil. In the women's kitchen, Bev served salty risotto, but Joy and Melanie did well with appetizers and meat. In the men's kitchen, Ralph ignored Mike on the appetizer station, causing Ramsay to scold them both; but Mike served risotto with no lobster. After Richard and Ralph served cold crab cakes and watery ravioli, Ramsay forced them to eat their mistakes, while Chris's fillets were undercooked. After the women finished service, Ramsay had them help the men, where Jason got into a heated argument with Sandra, forcing Ramsay to intervene. Elimination: Mike and DeMarco were nominated. Mike pleaded to be transferred to the women, but Ramsay eliminated him for his lack of passion and effort, terrible attitude, refusal to be a team player, and for consistently being a poor performer. Mike's comment: "I definitely feel like I was the fall guy. I'm gonna have fun watching the guys go down, because they're a bunch of backstabbing bitches. There's no camaraderie there. I will definitely forget about these guys as quickly as they've chosen to forget about me." Ramsay's comment: "There once was a cook named Mike. He couldn't cook fish or any other dish, so I told him to take a hike."
171	5	"16 Chefs Compete"	April 10, 2014	4.17
Team challenge: The chefs played a variant of Concentration where they had to match side dishes with four different types of protein (pork chop, swordfish, ahi tuna, and chicken breast) in pairs. Melanie and Rochelle and Anton and Richard both scored with chicken breast. Chris and DeMarco scored over Jessica and Kashia with pork. Sandra and Beth scored over Jason and Gabriel with ahi tuna. Joy and Bev scored over Scott and Ralph with swordfish. The women earned their third straight challenge win. Reward/punishment: The women were rewarded with a day of kayaking at Laguna Beach, followed by lunch at Studio Restaurant at the Montage Laguna Beach Resort. The men prepped over 100 pounds of honey taffy from scratch and had sardine smoothies for lunch. Before prep, DeMarco told his team that his father walked out on him when he was six months old. Service: A brunch service was set up as part of the first-ever Hell's Kitchen wedding, with the faster team winning service. The women served the bride's family; the men served the groom's family; and both did the wedding party's table. Rochelle and Scott got fruit salads out quickly, but Beth broke an egg and burned bread. Beth then struggled to keep up on the croque monsieur station and argued with Kashia and Bev, resulting in her serving a raw egg after being pressured by Kashia to bring it up. For the men, Ralph tried to cook bread in a cold pan and undercooked eggs. However, DeMarco caught the blame for serving the egg, despite telling Ralph the egg was undercooked and Ralph ignoring him. Both teams got to the final ticket. Despite Beth overcooking another egg, the women finished first, due to Gabriel and Richard's slow performance on scrambled eggs, giving them the win and the men their fifth consecutive service loss. Elimination: DeMarco and Gabriel were nominated but Chef Ramsay also nominated Richard. Ramsay eliminated DeMarco for his lack of improvement. With DeMarco being nominated five consecutive times (the longest streak of nominations in the show's history, later tied with Season 14's Josh Trovato), Ramsay said that DeMarco ran out of chances. DeMarco's comment: "The blue team had it in for me from the beginning. No matter what I did, it wasn't good enough. My team took away the chance for me to be head chef, and it kills me. But this isn't the end. I know I can cook, and I have a lot to prove to a lot of people." Ramsay's comment: "DeMarco: demented, demoted, denied."
172	6	"15 Chefs Compete"	April 17, 2014	4.95
Team captain nomination: No challenge took place; Ramsay asked both teams to choose a team captain for dinner service. Melanie and Anton were chosen. Melanie stated she would lead from the fish station, while Anton stated he would "float" around stations to lead. Joy noticed Beth looking unfocused during prep and suggested the women proceed to service without her, prompting a heated argument. Service: Ramsay put the team captains to the test when he announced the VIP guests for the chef's table, with the women cooking for Elizabeth Perkins and the men cooking for Holly Marie Combs. Sandra forgot a capellini on appetizers and Joy argued with her for not communicating, while Beth served raw and overcooked lobster and was non-communicative, leading Melanie to take over most of her responsibilities. However, Melanie, whose leadership was largely ineffectual, ruined the VIP table's order with raw halibut, and Kashia served perfect Wellingtons but was slow to say when they would be ready. Anton's leadership, meanwhile, was fairly overzealous though seemingly more effective; however, Ramsay scolded him for shouting over him while he was reading a ticket. Gabriel and Ralph put in strong performances on appetizers under Anton's leadership, but Chris sent overcooked and undercooked scallops, the latter of which Anton served for the chef's table without Ramsay's approval first. Jason performed well on meat, but Scott had communication issues despite cooking fish perfectly. Both teams completed service; Ramsay gave the men their first service win and praised Anton's leadership. Elimination: Beth and Sandra were nominated. Ramsay polled the team, and though all except Jessica wanted Sandra gone, Ramsay sent Sandra back in line and eliminated Beth for her lack of leadership and confidence, being out of her depth, and sub-par performances. Beth's comment: "I wouldn't change coming here for $1 million. But I'm worried that I'm never gonna be better than I am at this moment. And it scares the shit out of me. Right now, all I want to do is go home... and cry to my mama." Ramsay's comment: "Beth thinks the reason she hasn't advanced in the culinary industry is the fact that she's a woman in the South. I think it's because she can't cook."
173	7	"14 Chefs Compete"	April 24, 2014	4.92
Team challenge: The teams had to cook four gourmet pizzas to be rated from 1–10 by Ramsay and Wolfgang Puck. Due to their uneven numbers, each team worked as a solo chef plus three pairs of chefs and was allowed to not serve the presumably worst pizza. The men did not serve Jason and Chris's pizza, while the women decided Bev and Kashia's was the weakest, despite Bev and Kashia's protesting that Joy and Jessica's pizza (which was very small and simple after Joy accidentally dropped their original pizza on the floor) was worse. Rochelle scored 5, while Ralph scored 3. Joy and Jessica scored 4, while Gabriel and Scott scored 5. Lastly, Melanie and Sandra scored 3, but Anton and Richard scored 7, giving the men a 15–12 win. After declaring the men the winners, Ramsay and Puck tasted Bev and Kashia's pizza and said it would have also scored 7, as it was the best pizza by far from the red team. Reward/punishment: The men were rewarded with a pool day and a yoga session on the roof of the Andaz West Hollywood hotel. The women made ravioli for Italian family night and prepped both kitchens. After the punishment, Kashia called out Melanie for unilaterally deciding to drop the former's pizza, but Melanie argued that Kashia should have been more outspoken about her confidence in her pizza. Service: Both teams struggled with pizzas during family night. Bev repeatedly undercooked and burned the pizzas, and Sandra rolled the dough too thick which completely held up the kitchen. However, with Joy's help, Bev managed to successfully get the pizzas out. Rochelle served scallops with no color, but managed to recover. After that, the women were able to successfully complete service (as well as successfully serve Ramsay's family in the dining room). In the men's kitchen, Chris constantly made burnt and raw pizzas while Scott tried to help, but only made the situation worse by burning even more pizzas. Even with additional help from Gabriel, the men were only able to serve ten pizzas before running out of pizza dough, causing Ramsay to send Scott and Chris into the dining room to apologize to the diners and ask them if they'd like something else. Anton accidentally caused a small fire on the fish station when the bottom of a bottle of oil came off when he picked it up, and Ralph served raw rib-eye then undercooked and poorly cut lamb. However, thanks to Jason, the men finished service. During the postmortem, Ramsay asked both teams to collect all the discarded pizzas to show the amount they had wasted. Despite Ramsay being angry with both teams, Ramsay named the women the winners for having fewer problems on each station, and asked the men to come up with two nominees for elimination. Elimination: The men nominated Chris and Scott for their problems with the pizzas. After hearing their pleas Ramsay also nominated Ralph, who had argued that he had nothing returned to him despite his abysmal performance on meat. After hearing their pleas (during which Ralph angered Ramsay by trying to claim he had yet to mess up), Ramsay eliminated Chris for consistently wasting pizza dough and mediocre performances. Chris's comment: "My creativity in the kitchen goes far beyond what these fools can do. I made a mistake relying on my teammates, and it ended up being my demise. It's the heat of Hell's Kitchen. You can win or you can lose. You can get burned. And I got burned." Ramsay's comment: "I like to think every chef has a talent. Chris needs to keep looking for his."
174	8	"13 Chefs Compete"	May 1, 2014	4.47
Team challenge: The teams had to cook sampler dishes for attendees of a dinner honoring the 160th anniversary of the Phi Mu sorority. Each team had to serve a chicken, seafood, and beef entrée. The women did well under Kashia's leadership, while the men wasted over 10 minutes deliberating, barely finishing on time. The men scored on chicken, but the women won 2–1 by scoring on seafood and beef. Reward/punishment: The women were rewarded each with a $500 shopping spree at the Forum Shops at Caesars Palace in Las Vegas, where they met Season 10 winner Christina Wilson. Following their meetup with Christina, the women had a special dinner prepared personally by Guy Savoy at his restaurant, Restaurant Guy Savoy. The men decorated the dining room under the direction of the sorority's party committee. Service: Gabriel and Richard put in strong performances on appetizers and garnish and got the men off to a good start on appetizers. However, Jason served raw fried chicken twice, forcing Anton and Gabriel to help him; and Scott, despite cooking meat perfectly, didn't communicate to Richard and Gabriel on garnish when he was going to walk up to the pass, which put both of them behind. Despite this, both Scott and Jason managed to recover and successfully serve entrées. The women got off to a bad start due to Bev struggling to make crab cakes and giving inconsistent times for them, but Bev still managed to successfully serve them. However, on entrées, Kashia served raw fried chicken while Jessica did very little to help her, forcing Ramsay to pull them both into the pantry and tell them to get a grip. Sandra, however, had a successful performance on the fish station. After that, Kashia again served raw chicken that Jessica thought was cooked, but managed to recover and serve a properly cooked portion. However, Bev forgot what the vegetarian option was and then proceeded to serve cold mac and cheese, causing Rochelle to take over for her on garnish. Both teams finished service; Ramsay called out both teams' lack of teamwork but named the men winners. Elimination: Bev and Jessica were nominated. After a heated argument between the two women during their pleas, Ramsay sent Jessica back in line and eliminated Bev for her lack of intensity and letting Rochelle take over her station during service. Bev's comment: "Chef Ramsay, you made a very big mistake tonight. You're willing to keep a bunch of crybabies, who are emotional all the time? Really, you want these people to run your restaurant? How about someone who didn't fucking cry or never gave up? How about that?!" Ramsay's comment: "Bev may be a great food truck chef. Unfortunately for her, Hell's Kitchen doesn't have wheels."
175	9	"12 Chefs Compete"	May 8, 2014	4.30
Team challenge: Ramsay tested the chefs' adaptability, placing six ingredients under four domes. Every few minutes, a new dome became available, and each chef would have to grab one ingredient from the dome to incorporate in their dish. They had 30 minutes to make their dishes, judged by Chef Michael Cimarusti. Kashia scored over Ralph on New York strip; Rochelle scored over Richard on lobster; Jason scored over Joy on sea bass; both Gabriel and Melanie scored on chicken and Anton scored over Jessica on ahi tuna. Sandra then scored over Scott on duck breast, giving the women a 4–3 win and their sixth challenge victory, out of eight. Reward/punishment: The women were rewarded with lunch at the Terranea Resort in Rancho Palos Verdes and a private volleyball lesson with Olympian Kerri Walsh Jennings on the beach. The men had to do the waitstaff's chores, which included doing their laundry and cleaning the dining room and the main entrance. Cook for your life: Instead of a service, Ramsay called each chef into his office one by one, evaluating their progress and asking them who they felt was the weakest chef in their team. Jessica and Richard received the most votes and were each given 30 minutes to cook three dishes (risotto, scallops, and halibut) to be judged by Ramsay. The loser was eliminated, resulting in the first elimination challenge in Hell's Kitchen. The episode ended in a cliffhanger, as Ramsay was about to announce his decision.
176	10	"11 Chefs Compete"	May 15, 2014	4.86
Cook for your life – continued: Ramsay eliminated a tearful Jessica for undercooking lobster in the risotto and overcooking halibut. However, he praised her hard work and passion and gave her encouragement. Jessica did not receive a comment from Ramsay or a coat-hanging and picture-burning sequence, but her hung jacket and burned picture was seen next to Ralph's. Jessica's comment: "This is my dream, and it just is so crushing. I have so much passion, and I know I'm the person that is right for the job. I deserve to be here. I know I do. I know I do." Pre-service: The next morning, Ramsay brought the chefs to his gastropub (Note: The gastropub was The Fat Cow, the same restaurant Ramsay took the challenge winners to in this season's first episode; it went unnamed on-air because the episodes were shot months prior, but by the time Season 12 debuted on television The Fat Cow was two weeks away from closing its doors permanently.) to give them inspiration before he announced that the next service would have a special menu based on it. During prep back at Hell's Kitchen, Ralph began to feel sick, caused by bad sleep (courtesy of Gabriel's snoring the night before), but returned before service. Service: The men did well on appetizers under Jason's leadership, with the only problem being Anton not communicating with the other stations and cooking sliders too fast. However, they had a complete meltdown on entrées; Anton forgot to cook a New York strip for a table and then miscommunicated to Ramsay how long the next table would be, while screaming at Ralph and Jason when they tried to correct him. Scott served watery salad and soggy fries and his attempts to lead the kitchen proved largely ineffectual. Ralph had trouble keeping up on the fish station due to Anton and Gabriel's lack of communication and undercooked fish and chips. Gabriel struggled cooking the chicken and gave Ramsay and the rest of the kitchen inconsistent cooking times, leading some tables to walk out. The women had a decent service, with the only problems being Joy initially not knowing she had to cook the buns for the sliders and Kashia serving cold garnish and then forgetting the garnish for the chicken. The women finished service and all but Sandra, who was on desserts, were ordered to help the men. However, the women struggled to work together with the men, who once again had trouble communicating. After Ralph served a soggy fish, Ramsay kicked the men out and had the women finish their service. The women were named the winners, and Ramsay tasked the men to name two nominees for elimination. Elimination: Scott and Gabriel were chosen as the men's nominees. However, Gabriel attempted to nominate Ralph when asked by Ramsay who the nominees were. This led Ramsay to express frustration over the men's lack of teamwork, and although he accepted Gabriel and Scott as the nominees, he also nominated Ralph (sarcastically stating "why not"). After each of them pleaded their case, Ramsay eliminated Ralph for his problems with the fish and chips, refusing to take responsibility for his mistakes (he attempted to blame his problems that night on the lack of communication in the kitchen), and mediocre performances, saying he was not ready to be a head chef. Ralph's comment: "Where I come from, you don't rat people out, you take it on the chin, and you go forward. Gabriel choked tonight, and it'll catch up to him. His time will come. I'm definitely not the worst chef in that kitchen. Chef Ramsay, you just made the wrong decision tonight. I feel bad because, you know, I could've showed you a lot more." Ramsay's comment: "Ralph has a lot of heart. But when it comes to cooking, he comes up a little short."
177	11	"10 Chefs Compete"	May 22, 2014	4.34
Team challenge: The chefs had to match eight cuts of pork with eight body parts of a pig; the men won, so each of them was allowed to choose which cut of pork they wanted to cook with and which member of the women's team they wished to compete against. Melanie scored over Anton on the shoulder and Rochelle scored over Richard on loin, giving the women an early 2-0 lead. Gabriel scored over Joy on ribs and Jason scored over Sandra on the belly. Lastly, Scott surprised Ramsay by presenting a completed ravioli dish and scored over Kashia on pork cheek, giving the men a 3–2 win. Reward/punishment: The men went skydiving with Jean-Philippe at iFly and each received their own Vitamix blender. The women made peanut butter by shelling peanuts by hand and prepped both kitchens. During the punishment, Rochelle opened up about her desire to start a family, causing her teammates to question her dedication. Service: The men got off to a good start with Jason and Scott on appetizers (with Jason having taken over making the latter's risotto due to not trusting him), but Anton cooked only nine scallops instead the required ten and then pushed Scott away when he tried to help. On entrées, Anton overcooked halibut and blamed Scott for it, due to the latter confusing him and causing Ramsay to march all the men into the store room and tell them to sort out their differences. However, on the next ticket, despite Richard providing perfect Wellingtons, Gabriel ruined the ticket with cold mushrooms, forcing them to start over. In addition, Anton continued to have trouble on the fish station, sending overcooked salmon to the pass while blaming Scott, so Ramsay took over for him on the refire. In the women's kitchen, Rochelle did well on appetizers but was hampered by Sandra struggling to provide the lobster tail for the risotto (due to it falling apart) and Kashia forgetting to turn her gas on when cooking capellini. On entrées, Sandra did not communicate with Joy on garnish and Melanie on meat, and despite acknowledging not to bring up her salmon yet until Melanie's Wellington was ready, Sandra still brought her dish up when asked how long it would take by Ramsay. When Sandra finally managed to coordinate properly with the rest of the kitchen, the salmon was overcooked, leading Ramsay to have to refire that order. Despite the problems, both teams managed to complete service, but Ramsay was frustrated with the lack of coordination in both kitchens, and named both teams losers. He then tasked them with coming up with two nominees apiece for elimination, specifically stating to choose the people who were making it difficult to coordinate properly. Team change: The men nominated Anton and Scott. The women agreed on Sandra as their first nominee and considered Kashia as their second, but Rochelle was ultimately nominated after Joy argued against using her confessing her desire during the punishment as indicating a lack of passion. Ramsay was skeptical of Rochelle's nomination, but allowed it anyway, and had all four nominees remove their jackets before moving Anton and Scott to the women and Sandra and Rochelle to the men, hoping to "correct" things.
178	12	"10 Chefs Again"	May 29, 2014	4.54
Team challenge: Ramsay had each chef, one by one, enter a dark, makeshift "grocery store", where they had to use the sense of feel to collect five ingredients in one minute. He then gave them 30 minutes to use the ingredients, judging the winning team through a King of the Hill match between all chefs individually. Gabriel was not allowed to sit on the hill after forgetting his chicken mousse. Scott, Sandra, Anton, and Rochelle each got on the hill after presenting their dishes, with Rochelle remaining and beating out everyone else to win the challenge for the blue team. Reward/punishment: The blue team were rewarded with massages at LeSpa at the Sofitel Hotel in Beverly Hills, while the red team had to take in deliveries of food. Service: 24 UNICEF charity members were guests for service, including ambassador Angie Harmon, who served as the host for this special event. Each chef was in charge of a course, cooking twelve portions. On the risotto course, Anton's only problems were having the pans too hot at the start and then having trouble communicating with Joy, who was doing the lobster tails, while Rochelle briefly confused Gabriel by taking over his seasoning of the risottos. On the tuna tataki course, Melanie had no trouble, but Gabriel forgot to cook two tuna. Luckily, Rochelle noticed and she was able to successfully cook the additional tuna and get the course out on time. Both Kashia and Richard struggled leading the tortellini course. The former failed to notice that the tortellini was undercooked and then blamed Melanie and Anton for it, which completely held up the kitchen. Richard failed to take all the tortellini out of the pasta water and, as a result, came up short when plating, while the remaining tortellini overcooked during that time. As a result, the blue diners received reduced portions, which was exacerbated when Gabriel put out thirteen plates instead of twelve. On the rack of lamb, Scott led strongly, only struggling to put sauce on the plates due to using a ladle instead of a spoon. Sandra failed to notice that the lamb was undercooked, and then overcooked it when she attempted to quickly flash it in the oven, despite warnings from Jason and Ramsay. This forced the blue team to serve only one lamb chop per guest. Lastly, Joy and Jason both led well and got the beignet courses out with no problems. Despite both teams completing service, Ramsay named both teams losers and asked for two nominees from each team. Elimination: The red team nominated Kashia and Scott while the blue team nominated Sandra and Gabriel. Ramsay send both Scott and Gabriel and then Kashia back in line and eliminated Sandra for her issues on lamb and her lack of coordination with her team. Sandra's comment: "I definitely feel like something slipped away. I had it in my fingers, and I feel like I dropped the ball tonight. I know in my heart I'm a better chef than a lot of the people in there. Tonight was just not my night, but I've done a lot of great things here. I don't have anything to hang my head low about at all. Not at all." Ramsay's comment: "It may have been charity night in Hell's Kitchen, but when it comes to Sandra, I wasn't in a charitable mood."
179	13	"9 Chefs Compete"	June 5, 2014	4.78
Pre-service: For the second time this season, there was no challenge; the chefs were visited by two rappers, who sang instructions for the teams to create their own menus. Melanie forced through most of her ideas for the red team, while shooting down Kashia's and Anton's ideas; but Anton, Joy, and Kashia were still able to get some of their dishes on as well (including Kashia's dish from the signature dish challenge). However, Kashia was irritated with Melanie for shooting down her tuna slider idea but then later recommending it to the rest of the team as her own idea, while the red team expressed concern over Joy's fried chicken dish due to the problems both teams had with fried chicken on a previous service. Most of the blue team contributed ideas for their menu, but they had to prompt Rochelle for input on the menu, due to her lack of confidence. Ramsay felt both menus were decent, but insisted on tweaks; expressed similar concern over Joy's fried chicken dish; and reprimanded Rochelle when she burnt a sampler crab cake and giggled nervously. Despite that, both teams got their menus approved and then had to prep for service that night. However, during prep, Rochelle got overwhelmed and argued with her team, leading to a crisis of confidence until she was encouraged by Kashia in the dorms. Service: Actor Max Ehrich was the guest star attending this service. During this service, each diner would have the choice of which menu they would choose from, with the blue menu ultimately being the more popular of the two. Although Jason was worried about Rochelle on appetizers due to her earlier crisis, Rochelle managed to consistently get appetizers out at a good pace. However, Richard undercooked crab cakes and almost cooked the refire in a dirty pan until Ramsay stopped him, but managed to recover. Gabriel, however, served undercooked steaks twice while Richard was slow on garnish and delivered under-portioned sides, causing Ramsay to have to send Rochelle over to help him. In the red kitchen, Anton cooked more portions of risotto than needed; and Melanie had trouble cooking Anton's scallop dish, after he told her to sear the scallops then bake them in sauce, which turned them soggy, forcing her to throw away several orders of scallops. When Melanie had scallops returned for being undercooked, she noticed that she was out of scallops. Luckily, Anton was able to get extra scallops from the blue team because they didn't put a scallop course on their menu, allowing Melanie to successfully cook the refire. Despite the team's worries about the fried chicken dish, Joy got every order out perfectly, while Kashia delivered every order of her signature dish perfectly. Ramsay named the red team winners for a strong finish, and told them that one of the women would be transferring to the blue team after elimination. Elimination: Despite Gabriel and Richard attempting to convince Jason to nominate Rochelle due to her earlier crisis, the blue team ultimately decided on Richard and Gabriel as the nominees. Ramsay eliminated Richard for failing to live up to his experience, lacking Gabriel's determination, and being kicked off his station by Rochelle. However, he warned Gabriel that he was on his very last chance, and that his performances would need to dramatically improve in order for him to stay. Richard's comment: "I'm 48 years old. I wasn't supposed to be here, and I did everything anybody else, who was 28, did, as good or better. I wanted to be there at the end, but am I gonna go pout and cry about it? Fuck, no. It's been a great experience. I'd do it again in a heartbeat. I'd do it at 49 and really piss people off." Team change: The red team then announced that they would send Melanie to the blue team to even up the numbers. Ramsay's comment: "Richard had more experience than anyone here. But it's not experience I'm looking for, it's talent."
180	14	"8 Chefs Compete"	June 12, 2014	4.88
Team challenge: The annual "blind taste test" took place; Rochelle identified three ingredients compared to Joy's two; Anton and Gabriel both scored one; and Scott scored two while Jason failed to get any. Lastly, Melanie also did not get any, while Kashia scored one, giving the red team a 6–4 win. Reward/punishment: The red team were rewarded with a private ice skating lesson with Olympian Rachael Flatt, while the blue team had to take in deliveries of ice and make ice cream by hand for service. Concerned about Gabriel's lack of fightback, Ramsay gave him a pep talk in the storeroom before service. Service: Football player Ryan Pickett and actor Dante Basco were in attendance for this service. The blue team had a strong service thanks to Melanie on appetizers and Gabriel on garnish, with the only problems being Jason briefly falling behind while cooking lobster tails and Rochelle serving undercooked chicken then struggling to remember tickets; but both rebounded, as Gabriel quickly reorganized the team. In the red kitchen, Scott got the kitchen off to a good start on appetizers, but Kashia forgot to cook one scallop. When Scott tried to help, he cooked an entire portion rather than just one scallop. Anton then caused disarray when he jumped in as well; however, Kashia managed to quickly retake control of her station and serve an acceptable scallop. Kashia was caught braising a salmon in sauce rather than searing it and gave attitude to Ramsay when he scolded her for it. On entrées, Anton undercooked chicken, but when Scott sliced it and served it, Ramsay scolded the latter for not noticing that it was raw. Anton then became disorganized on the meat station and fell behind on orders, telling Ramsay he was ten minutes away on a Wellington when Kashia's salmon was already at the pass. Anton then overcooked the Wellingtons, blamed the oven for his problems, and argued with Sous Chef Andi (who in turn berated him intensely), causing Ramsay to send him to the storeroom and tell him to bounce back. After both teams finished service, Ramsay praised the blue team, particularly Gabriel, for their excellent service, but berated the red team and asked them to nominate two people for elimination. Elimination: Anton and Scott were nominated. In a shocking twist, Ramsay eliminated frontrunner Anton for his arrogance, downward spiral, disintegrating performances, refusal to be a team player, and constantly blaming others for his mistakes. Anton's comment: "I think Chef Ramsay might have taken tonight as arrogance, but I know my abilities. One day, Chef Ramsay and I will meet again. Maybe next time, it'll be his restaurant next door to mine. I didn't walk away with the crown, but I was the best out of everybody in there. So that makes me the winner of Hell's Kitchen in my opinion." Ramsay's comment: "Anton let the little success he had in Hell's Kitchen inflate his ego. It was time to let the air out of that balloon."
181	15	"7 Chefs Compete"	June 19, 2014	5.13
Team challenge: The chefs were taken to Bristol Farms and given $35 per team and 15 minutes to shop for ingredients and 30 minutes to cook three dishes. Since the blue team had an extra member, Rochelle and Gabriel worked together. The guest judges were editor of LAist Krista Simmons, Master Yelper Anita Lau, and Innovative Dining Group (IDG) Director of Development Brent Berkowitz. Each judge gave a price they would pay for the dish and the three prices were averaged to give a score. Kashia's top sirloin with bourbon sauce scored $24.67, while Jason's Cornish hen scored $20. Rochelle and Gabriel's trout dish scored $21.33, while Scott's pan-roasted sea bass and jumbo shrimp scored $23.67. Joy's seared pork loin rubbed with sage, salt, black pepper, and spiced applesauce scored $24.67, while Melanie's lamb chops with fresh rosemary, garlic, and lemon sage couscous scored $28. The blue team's total was $69.33, but the red team won the challenge with their total of $73.01. Reward/punishment: The red team were rewarded with a $1,000 shopping spree at The Grove at Farmers Market, followed by lunch at Hatfield's Restaurant in Los Angeles. The blue team cleaned the dorms and bathrooms. Challenge: At a press conference the next day, Ramsay revealed the season's first individual challenge, in which each chef would be competing to earn a black jacket, immunity from elimination in the next dinner service, and their dish a place on the December page of the first Hell's Kitchen calendar. Each chef was given 45 minutes to create a dish of their choice. Ramsay then revealed three guest judges alongside him to judge the dishes, Season 3 winner Rock Harper; Season 9 winner Paul Niedermann, whom Jason meets for the first time since he withdrew due to illness; and Season 10 3rd place finisher Dana Cohen; each judge rated the dishes from 1–5. Jason's stuffed halibut with capellini, goat cheese, crab and shrimp scored 8; Kashia's rack of lamb covered with honey pistachio and demi-glace scored 11; Rochelle's seared New York Strip steak with cilantro-lime chimichurri sauce scored 13; Scott's pan-seared sea scallops and poached crab with tarragon butter scored 11; Melanie's marinated rack of lamb with red wine rosemary garlic and creamy basil-infused mashed potatoes scored 5 because she added raw flour to the potatoes; and Gabriel's roasted rack of lamb did not even score a single point because he forgot to plate most of it, and the part that he did plate was severely overcooked. Last up was Joy, with a seared duck breast with oven-roasted figs, mushrooms, and Swiss chard. Before marks were given and clarification on whether Joy or Rochelle won immunity, the episode ended in a cliffhanger.
182	16	"7 Chefs Again"	June 26, 2014	4.95
Challenge – continued: Joy's dish impressed all four judges (even though she admitted she had never used most of the ingredients before), earning her an almost perfect score of 19 points. Reward/punishment: Joy earned a black jacket and immunity from elimination after service, a December spot on the calendar, and was also treated to lunch with Rock, Paul, and Dana in the Hell's Kitchen dining room. The others prepared the food and served it to them. Service: Before service, Ramsay revealed that every chef surviving elimination after service would be rewarded with a black jacket. Dinner service featured a special VIP table for members of Oxfam, an anti-poverty charity, including ambassador and actress Minnie Driver, founder Raymond Offenheiser, and contributor Chris Wylde. Both teams had to serve them at the same time; but Gabriel served scallops too early and miscounted them before overcooking them, though he recovered quickly; and Melanie served undercooked chicken. In the red kitchen, Kashia served perfectly cooked, but poorly cut, chicken; and Scott cooked an order of halibut too early and had trouble cooking salmon for Minnie Driver. Gabriel was caught cooking halibut and salmon in the same pan before serving raw salmon to the Oxfam table. Automatic elimination: After Scott and Gabriel both served overcooked and raw salmon respectively for the Oxfam table, Ramsay pulled them into the storage room. When they returned, they completed the VIP table. While Scott bounced back, Gabriel served raw salmon again, which caused Ramsay to lose his patience with him and eliminate him on the spot. Gabriel is the sixth contestant in Hell's Kitchen history to be eliminated during service, and also the first since Nilka Hendricks from Season 7 (Nilka is the last chef who was ejected from Hell's Kitchen during dinner service, but she went to the back door to the loading dock). Instead of sending Gabriel upstairs like the rest, Ramsay sent him through the front entrance, shocking the blue team and the customers. Outside, Jean-Philippe consoled him before taking his jacket and shaking his hand goodbye. Gabriel did not receive a coat-hanging and picture-burning scene. The teams were named joint-losers and each asked to nominate one chef for elimination. Gabriel's comment: "It just didn't go my way tonight. It was just one bad service too many. Instead of getting a black jacket, they took my blue jacket. My fucking heart hurts right now, man, because... I was this fucking close." Elimination: Jason and Scott were nominated. Ramsay called down Melanie and criticized her poor service, only to give her a black jacket. He ultimately decided to give everyone else a black jacket, having already eliminated Gabriel mid-service. Ramsay's comment: "With Gabriel causing such a disaster in the kitchen tonight, it was hard to tell who else I should send home. So I gave everybody the thrill of getting a black jacket, but somebody will definitely be going home after the next dinner service."
183	17	"6 Chefs Compete"	July 3, 2014	4.30
Challenge: The chefs traveled to the Los Angeles Memorial Coliseum, where they cooked gourmet tailgate party food favorites for USC Trojans football fans; the dish voted best by a group of 50 fans won. The challenge ended in a tie between Scott and Jason. Reward/punishment: Scott and Jason had lunch at the Saddle Peak Lodge in the Santa Monica Mountains, while the others sorted garbage from the tailgate party. Jason got drunk during the reward, and in addition to arriving late to prep the next morning, was very sluggish in helping out. Service: Appetizers ran okay, but Scott had to restart the risotto on the final table after overcooking it and didn't respond when Ramsay asked him what happened. As a result, Ramsay berated Scott and accused him of trying to hide his mistakes. Additionally, Kashia mistakenly cooked one lobster tail instead of two and accused Scott and Joy of not communicating properly with her, even though they had told her to cook two lobster tails. Kashia also refused Melanie's help to run her food to the pass and then lied to Ramsay that Melanie had declined to help her when Ramsay asked why they weren't working together. This caused Ramsay to march both of them into the storeroom where he told them to sort out their differences. On entrées, Rochelle had trouble slicing chicken, forcing Ramsay to help her, while Kashia failed to communicate with the rest of the kitchen and then proceeded to serve raw salmon. Kashia then lashed out at Jason and Rochelle when they asked her for times on the refire and maintained a morose attitude towards the rest of her team, causing Ramsay to send Scott to help her. However, Scott and Kaisha started to send raw halibut to a table, which forced Ramsay to send the table a substitute dish, hoping the halibut could be cooked in time. Kashia and Scott were not able to, and Scott talked back to Ramsay after the latter accused him of not caring. The team finished service, but Ramsay was far from pleased and had the chefs nominate one person for elimination. Elimination: Kashia was nominated; Ramsay also nominated Scott since he found his arguing "unacceptable". (Note: Scott's nomination for elimination tied him with Autumn Lewis from season 7, Sabrina Brimhall from season 8, Elise Wims from season 9, and Clemenza Caserta from season 10 as the most nominated contestant in the history of the show, at seven nominations.) Despite his continued frustration with Scott, Ramsay eliminated Kashia for her volatile attitude during service and poor performance on fish, feeling she was not yet ready to be a head chef. However, he praised her for her effort, passion, cooking ability, and heart, telling her she would have a great career. Kashia's comment: "I came into this with no culinary education. This was a roller coaster ride from the beginning, but I didn't realize how strong I was until I got here. I've made some friendships that I will keep. And I've got so many stories to go home and share with my family. You know, the underdog prevails sometimes. I'm not someone who gives up. When one door closes, I think about the next four that can open for me. This will not be the last time America sees Kashia." Ramsay's comment: "Kashia is a great line cook with an incredible attitude. Unfortunately for her, she's just not ready to run her own brigade yet."
184	18	"5 Chefs Compete"	July 10, 2014	4.79
Challenge: The chefs watched a performance by Street Drum Corps, who used discarded everyday objects as their musical instruments. The chefs were then given 30 minutes to make a dish using leftovers from the refrigerators, which would be judged on taste and presentation by Ramsay and magazine food editor Laurie Buckle. While Jason, Joy, and Rochelle received poor reviews, Scott won, narrowly beating out Melanie. Reward/punishment: Scott was rewarded with a photo-shoot for Better Homes and Gardens magazine, where his dish was featured, followed by flying in a fighter jet, when he chose Jason to join him for the jet ride. The others had to take in a delivery of pumpkins and acorn squash and prep them, during which Rochelle cut her thumb and was sent to the hospital but returned in time for dinner service. Service: Comic book legend Stan Lee was a guest at the chef's table. The Red Hat Society along with Bree Williamson and Keran Giovanni were also guests for this service. Scott had a strong performance on appetizers despite being forced to clean burning rice on the stove, while Melanie failed twice to cook an acceptable capellini for the chef's table, but recovered. Rochelle, on meat, led on entrées and constantly called out times; but Joy, despite acknowledging Rochelle's times, served fish too early, angering Ramsay. Joy's exit: When Ramsay called out Joy for again serving the fish before Jason's garnish was ready, Joy argued with Ramsay before leaving the kitchen, saying "I'm done!" and angrily throwing off her jacket despite pleas from her teammates not to leave. Ramsay followed Joy and called her out on her selfish behavior, but Joy talked back once more, saying she was done with Ramsay, who snapped "I know you're done, it shows in your cooking!" She went upstairs to the dorms. The remaining chefs persevered and finished service, while Joy packed her bags. Sous Chef Andi attempted to motivate Joy, and while Joy regretted her decision to walk out, she withdrew from the competition, believing it was too late to ask Ramsay for another chance. She was the third chef to walk out of the competition during service, following Jeff LaPoff from Season 1 and Andrew Forster from Season 7. Joy received a burning picture scene, but it is unknown whether her jacket was hung even though she threw it off. Joy's comment: "It's too late. I can't apologize. And I feel like I let Chef Ramsay down, and I didn't think about anybody but myself when I walked out that kitchen. I was really hungry, I really wanted it, but the closer I got to the end, the more I started doubting myself. And I should've never did that, because my doubt is what drove me to just walk away. Now that I sit back and think about everything that went on here, and I realize I've come a long way. Ever since my first service, my worst service, I've only moved forward. I grew a lot in the kitchen and outside of the kitchen. I made a best friend while I was here, and I was the first one to get a black jacket. I really did blow one of the biggest opportunities I've had in a long time. And it was everything I asked for. And I threw it all away. I threw it all away. And that's just something I have to live with." Elimination: Ramsay didn't say much about Joy after her departure, although he did state her decision to leave proved to him that she isn't ready to be a head chef, and that he expects everyone else to have a better attitude at this stage of the competition. He also added that to be a great head chef, one needs to have composure, discipline, and maturity, and that Joy lacked all of those things in her decision to leave. Ramsay then told the remaining chefs that despite the ups and downs, they all fought back, and that no one else would be leaving. However, he announced that after the next service, two chefs would be eliminated, with the other two advancing as finalists. Ramsay's comment: "Joy's quitting was one of the most shocking things I've ever experienced in Hell's Kitchen. But her lack of maturity tonight proved that she is not ready to be a head chef, because leaders never quit."
185	19	"4 Chefs Compete"	July 17, 2014	4.95
The chefs were greeted by Ramsay and security guards in the dining room. VIP guests then arrived; the chefs' loved ones (Rochelle's fiancé and parents, Melanie's boyfriend and mother, Jason's girlfriend and mother, and Scott's wife, son, and daughter). They all enjoyed a dish that Ramsay prepared for them in the dining room. Challenge: This led to the popular 40-minute "Taste it, now make it" challenge. Ramsay allowed the chefs to use a sample plate as a reference since most of them had eaten very little of the dish. For the protein, Jason, Melanie, and Rochelle chose sole, while Scott used escolar. For the garnish, Jason, Rochelle, and Scott chose butternut squash, while Melanie chose pumpkin. For the puree, Jason and Scott chose watercress, Melanie chose arugula, and Rochelle chose parsley. Ramsay revealed the protein was sole, eliminating Scott, and the garnish was butternut squash, eliminating Melanie. Jason then beat out Rochelle as he correctly used watercress for his puree, redeeming himself from his bad performance in the blind taste test. Reward/punishment: Jason went to two Los Angeles restaurants with Sous Chef Andi: the Fig & Olive and Ink, where he met up with his girlfriend and mother. He also won a set of stainless steel cookware. The others had to move furniture out of the dorms and prep the kitchen for dinner service. Rochelle sat out due to her cut thumb and Melanie intentionally sat out as well, hoping Scott would tire himself out and sabotage his chances of getting to the final. Service: Each chef took a turn running the pass, while also having to spot acts of sabotage by Ramsay and Sous Chef James. Rochelle was nervous running the pass as she read out tickets too fast and kept giggling, but after a pep talk by Ramsay, she recovered, rejecting poorly presented salads by Scott and catching shrimp in a risotto instead of lobster. Melanie also spoke very quickly and had a hard time focusing, and was also urged by Ramsay to take control. She improved, but failed to realize that Jean-Philippe had given her a ticket featuring a "Caesar special", despite none being on the menu. Scott held everyone to a high standard and was quick to point out even tiny flaws, which annoyed the other chefs; but he led effectively and caught a duck breast and a raw chicken breast that were substituted for two chicken breasts. Jason was laid-back at first, but then generally led well, catching a salmon being substituted for halibut. Elimination: Ramsay firstly eliminated Rochelle, but praised her for her energy, enthusiasm, and natural ability, saying she would have a bright future ahead of her. He then named Scott and Jason to advance to the final, eliminating Melanie. (Note: This marked the fourth all-male final in the show's history, the first time that a chef who competed in two seasons, Jason, advanced to the final, and the last all-male final until season 22.) Ramsay complimented Melanie on her performance, allowing her to keep her jacket. Neither Melanie or Rochelle received a coat hook or burning picture scene, nor a final comment from Ramsay. Rochelle's comment: "One of my biggest fears, coming in here, was the fact that I didn't have the experience as everybody else. There were definitely times where thoughts of doubt popped in my head. But I was able to push and push through it. Even being a catering chef, I stood my ground. I've learned so much, and it's been such an amazing journey. Chef Ramsay, thank you so much for this opportunity. And I feel like, in your next restaurant, I might be applying. And I won't laugh as much." Melanie's comment: "I came into this competition with a lot of confidence. I was one of the youngest ones here, and sometimes, I got thrown on my ass. But I always gave 175 million percent of myself. And I learned being a head chef is more than just putting out good food. Getting this far in this crazy-ass competition, I'm so much stronger, and I know what I'm capable of. I can only grow from here, I can only get better as the years go on. So, I mean, yeah, I lost tonight, but you'll see me in a couple years somewhere else."
186	20	"Winner Chosen"	July 24, 2014	5.17
Challenge: Ramsay invited Scott and Jason to the Vogue supperclub in Los Angeles, where they competed in their final challenge. Both prepared two appetizers and three entrées in one hour to be judged by five well-renowned chefs from 1–10. Scott won 43–42 after beating Jason on the beef entrée by one point. Reward: Scott was given the first pick in drafting a team using the ten chefs eliminated from the competition prior to the final. (Note: Joy and Richard did not return, so Bev and Chris took their places as the last two chefs eliminated prior to the top twelve.) Scott picked Chris, Ralph, Rochelle, Kashia, and Jessica, while Jason picked Anton, Melanie, Gabriel, and Bev, and was left with Sandra. Many of the women (particularly Melanie) were annoyed by the order of the selection, feeling it was blatantly sexist and that Scott and Jason were choosing based on whom they were friends with on the blue team, rather than considering people's abilities in the kitchen. Service: The finalists' families, along with actor Sean Kanan and actress Shanola Hampton, were guests for the final service, in addition to guests sitting at the chef's tables which included singer Natasha Bedingfield in Scott's kitchen and actor Mark Boone Junior in Jason's kitchen. In Jason's kitchen, despite strong performances from Anton, Melanie, and Bev, Sandra failed to provide times on garnish, served old crab cakes for the chef's table, argued with Jason, and worked slowly. Gabriel overcooked filets, but recovered. In Scott's kitchen, he got through appetizers fine thanks to Chris cooking perfect scallops, but Jessica was disorganized on garnish, serving an uneven remoulade sauce and soggy French fries before Scott kicked her out and had Rochelle take over, marking the second time a finalist threw a chef out of the kitchen. Ramsay praised Jason and Scott and announced the results were very close. Winner: After deliberating, Ramsay called Scott and Jason to his office and gave them final praise before sending them to two doors; Scott's door opened, making him the twelfth winner of Hell's Kitchen. (Note: Scott's win made the last male Hell's Kitchen winner until Trenton Garvey would later win in the twentieth season.) Though he left for medical reasons in the Season 9 premiere and actually made it this far in this season, Jason took his defeat graciously and felt Scott deserved to win. Scott gave a victory speech and thanked people for supporting him. Jason's comment: "I really thought my door was gonna open. I really thought that I had it. But Scott deserves it. He's got cooking skills up the wazoo, and I am truly very happy with Scott right now." Scott's comment: "Oh, my God. I just... I just fucking won. I can't believe it. I'm still in fucking shock. I pushed really hard. I gave everything I've ever had. It's been a tough road, and it hasn't been without some blood and tears. You know, there's no question this is the hardest thing I've ever done. My whole life is my wife and kids, and now, my kids are growing up on a beach." Ramsay's comment: "Scott won tonight, because he has all the qualities I'm looking for in a head chef. He is passionate, determined, and a true leader. He's an artist plating food and has a phenomenal palate. There's no doubt in my mind that he's got a great career ahead of him."
