= Hell's Kitchen Albania season 3 =

Reality show

Hell's Kitchen Albania
- Season 3
- Hosted by: Renato Mekolli
- No. of contestants: 18
- Winner: Erkiada Konci
- Runner-up: Donald Shena
- Location: Studio Nova, Tirana, Albania
- No. of episodes: 14

Release
- Original network: Top Channel
- Original release: October 2, 2020 – January 2, 2021

Season chronology
- ← Previous; Season 2

The third season of the Albanian competitive reality television series Hell's Kitchen Albania premiered on October 2, 2020 on Top Channel. Renato Mekolli returned as host and head chef. Winner and Runner-up from season 2, Francesko Tuku and Visara Pirra became the sous chefs for the Red Team and Blue Team respectively.

On January 2, 2021, chef Renato announced Erkiada Konci as the winner; making her the first female contestant to win Hell's Kitchen Albania.

== Chefs ==
Contestant	Age	Occupation	Result
Erkiada Konci	33	Chef	Winner
Donald Shena	21	Chef	Runner-up
Ergisa Pershyti	26	Bartenders	Eliminated in Finals
Joana Doda	37	Chef	Eliminated in Finals
Martin Dragoti	25	Chef	Eliminated after 13th Service
Megli Shuli	24	Chef	Eliminated after 12th Service
Eusebio Leka	28	Chef	Eliminated during the 11th Service
Xhesiana Mehilli	24	Chef	Eliminated after 10th Service
Armelo	23	Chef	Eliminated after 9th Service
Resmi Hakani	25	Animator	Eliminated after 9th Service
Robert	23	Kitchen helper	Eliminated after 8th Service
Leonard Gecaj	26	Kitchen helper	Eliminated after 7th Service
Kleidi Rexhepi	26	Chef	Eliminated after 6th Service
Marsilda Karafili	33	Call Center Operators	Eliminated after 5th Service
Indrit Moli	34	Chef	Eliminated before 5th Service
Darim Derka	34	Chef	Eliminated after 4th Service
Katerina Mucaj	27	Kitchen helper	Eliminated after 3rd Service
Hido Nano	21	Student	Eliminated after 2nd Service

== Contestant progress ==
		Original teams		With Armelo & Robert									Individuals			Finals	
No.	Chef	301	302	303	304	305		306	307	308	309	310	311	312	313	314	
1	Erkiada	LOSE	LOSE	LOSE	LOSE	IN	LOSE	LOSE	WIN	LOSE	LOSE	LOSE	IN	IN	IN	IN	WINNER
2	Donald	WIN	LOSE	LOSE	LOSE	IN	LOSE	LOSE	NOM	LOSE	NOM	LOSE	IN	IN	IN	IN	RUNNER-UP
3	Ergisa	LOSE	LOSE	LOSE	LOSE	IN	LOSE	LOSE	WIN	LOSE	LOSE	LOSE	IN	IN	IN	OUT	
3	Joana	LOSE	LOSE	LOSE	LOSE	IN	LOSE	NOM	WIN	LOSE	NOM	LOSE	IN	IN	IN	OUT	
5	Martin	WIN	LOSE	LOSE	LOSE	IN	LOSE	LOSE	NOM	LOSE	LOSE	LOSE	IN	IN	OUT		
6	Megli	LOSE	LOSE	LOSE	LOSE	IN	LOSE	LOSE	WIN	LOSE	LOSE	LOSE	IN	OUT			
7	Eusebio	WIN	LOSE	NOM	NOM	IN	LOSE	LOSE	NOM	LOSE	LOSE	LOSE	OUT (Note: Was ejected after he assaulted Chef Renato during service)				
8	Xhesiana	LOSE	LOSE	NOM	LOSE	IN	LOSE	LOSE	WIN	LOSE	LOSE	OUT					
9	Armelo	(Note: Chef was not in competition)		LOSE	LOSE	IN	LOSE	LOSE	LOSE	LOSE	OUT						
9	Resmi	WIN	LOSE	LOSE	NOM	IN	LOSE	LOSE	WIN	LOSE	OUT						
11	Robert			LOSE	LOSE	IN	LOSE	LOSE	LOSE	OUT							
12	Leonard	WIN	LOSE	LOSE	LOSE	IN	LOSE	LOSE	OUT								
13	Kleidi	WIN	LOSE	LOSE	LOSE	IN	LOSE	OUT									
14	Marsilda	LOSE	LOSE	LOSE	LOSE	IN	OUT										
15	Indrit	WIN	LOSE	NOM	LOSE	OUT											
16	Darim	WIN	LOSE	LOSE	OUT												
17	Katerina	LOSE	LOSE	OUT													
18	Hido	LOSE	OUT														

Keywords

- WIN = Won the dinner service
- LOSE = Lost the dinner service
- BoB = Best of the Best, usually exempt from nomination
- BoW = Best of the Worst, sometimes exempt from nomination
- IN = not nominated for elimination
- NOM = nominated for elimination
- OUT = eliminated normally
- LEFT = withdrew from competition
- HOSP = eliminated due to hospitalization
- EJEC = eliminated during service

Color key
Chef was eliminated after regular nomination
Chef was eliminated after Ramsay's nomination
Chef was eliminated without nomination
Chef was eliminated from winning team
Chef was eliminated in the Cook For Your Life challenge
Chef was nominated to participate in the Cook For Your Life challenge
Chef was eliminated during service
Chef withdrew from the competition
Chef was the Best of the Best/Worst
Chef was retained after regular nomination
Chef was retained after Ramsay's nomination
Chef's nomination was voided
The winner of Hell's Kitchen
The runner-up of Hell's Kitchen

== Team captains ==
Week #	Captains	
Week #	Team Red	Team Blue
1–9	No Captain	
10	Joana	Donald
11	Joana	
12–14	No Captain	
