= Hell's Kitchen (American TV series) season 6 =

Hell's Kitchen
- Season 6
- Region 1 DVD cover
- Hosted by: Gordon Ramsay
- No. of contestants: 17
- Winner: Dave Levey
- Runner-up: Kevin Cottle
- No. of episodes: 15

Release
- Original network: Fox
- Original release: July 21 – October 13, 2009

Season chronology
- ← Previous; Season 5 Next → Season 7

The sixth season of the American competitive reality television series Hell's Kitchen premiered on Fox on July 21, 2009, and concluded on October 13, 2009. Gordon Ramsay returned as host and head chef, while Scott Leibfried returned as the Blue Team's sous-chef, and season two winner Heather West returned as the Red Team's sous-chef, replacing Gloria Felix. Jean-Philippe Susilovic returned as maître d'.

The season was won by executive chef Dave Levey, with fellow executive chef Kevin Cottle finishing second.

== Contestants ==
Initially, sixteen chefs competed in season six, and were joined by a seventeenth, season five fifth-place finisher Robert Hesse, after the first dinner service.

Contestant	Age	Occupation	Hometown	Result
Dave Levey	32	Executive chef	Chester, New Jersey	Winner
Kevin Cottle (Note: Chef returned to compete on Hell's Kitchen in season 18, finished at 14th place.)	35	Executive chef	Plymouth, Massachusetts	Runner-up
Ariel Contreras-Fox (Note: Chef returned to compete on Hell's Kitchen in season 18, winning the season)	27	Sous-chef	Santa Cruz, California	Eliminated before finals
Tennille Middleton	28	Executive chef	Hampton Roads, Virginia	Eliminated after thirteenth service
Suzanne Schlicht	24	Sous-chef	Milwaukee, Wisconsin	Eliminated after twelfth service
Vincent "Van" Hurd (Note: Chef returned to compete on Hell's Kitchen in season 17 finished at 10th place.)	26	Fish cook	Buford, Georgia	Eliminated after eleventh service
Sabrina Gresset	34	Restaurant manager	New Caney, Texas	Eliminated after tenth service
Andy Husbands	39	Executive chef	Seattle, Washington	Eliminated after ninth service
Amanda Davenport	27	Sous-chef	Vancouver, Washington	Eliminated after eighth service
Robert Hesse (Note: Hesse first competed in season five of Hell's Kitchen, but withdrew in fifth place due to heart complications.)	30	Executive chef	Quogue, New York	Eliminated after seventh service
Jim McGloin	34	Sous-chef	Mendham, New Jersey	Eliminated after sixth service
Amanda "Tek" Moore	27	Line cook	Greenwich, Connecticut	Eliminated after fifth service
Connie "Lovely" Jackson	23	Children's camp executive chef	Chicago, Illinois	Eliminated after fourth service
Tony D'Alessandro	30	Culinary store manager	Chicago, Illinois	Eliminated after second service
Joseph Tinnelly	27	Sous-chef	Massapequa Park, New York	Quit after second service
Melinda Meaney	38	Private chef	Chadds Ford, Pennsylvania	Eliminated after first service
David "Louie" Cordio	45	Diner owner	Fitchburg, Massachusetts	Ejected during first service

== Contestant progress ==
Each week, the best member (determined by Ramsay) from the losing team during the latest service period is asked to nominate two of their teammates for elimination; one of these two is meant to be sent home by Ramsay. On some weeks, there is a variation in the nomination process, depending on the losing team's (or even winning team's) performance.

No.	Chef	Original teams	With Robert	1st switch							2nd switch	Individuals				Finals
No.	Chef	601	602/603		604	605	606	607	608	609	610	611	612	613	614	615
1	Dave	WIN	LOSE	WIN	WIN	WIN	LOSE	BoW	WIN	LOSE	LOSE	IN	IN	IN	IN	WINNER
2	Kevin	WIN	LOSE	WIN	WIN	WIN	LOSE	LOSE	WIN	LOSE	LOSE	IN	IN	IN	IN	RUNNER-UP
3	Ariel	LOSE	LOSE	BoW	LOSE	LOSE	LOSE	WIN	LOSE	LOSE	LOSE	NOM	NOM	IN	OUT	Dave's team
4	Tennille	LOSE	NOM	NOM	LOSE	NOM	LOSE	WIN	BoW	LOSE	LOSE	IN	IN	OUT (Note: Tennille was eliminated in the kitchen, during the post-mortem)		
5	Suzanne	LOSE	LOSE	LOSE	LOSE	LOSE	LOSE	WIN	NOM	NOM	LOSE	NOM	OUT			Dave's team
6	Van	WIN	LOSE	WIN	WIN	WIN	LOSE	NOM	WIN	LOSE	NOM	OUT				Kevin's team
7	Sabrina	LOSE	LOSE	LOSE	BoW	LOSE	NOM	WIN	NOM	NOM	OUT					Kevin's team
8	Andy	WIN	NOM	WIN	WIN	WIN	NOM	NOM	WIN	OUT						
9	Amanda	NOM	LOSE	LOSE	LOSE	NOM	LOSE	WIN	OUT							Kevin's team
10	Robert	(Note: Robert was not in competition)	LOSE	WIN	WIN	WIN	IN (Note: Robert was hospitalized and did not participate in service)	OUT								Dave's team
11	Jim	WIN	LOSE	WIN	WIN	WIN	OUT									
12	Tek	LOSE	LOSE	LOSE	NOM	OUT										
13	Lovely	LOSE	NOM	NOM	OUT											
14	Tony	WIN	OUT													
15	Joseph	WIN	LEFT													
16	Melinda	OUT														
17	Louie	EJEC														

Keywords

- WIN = Won the dinner service
- LOSE = Lost the dinner service
- BoB = Best of the Best, usually exempt from nomination
- BoW = Best of the Worst, sometimes exempt from nomination
- IN = not nominated for elimination
- NOM = nominated for elimination
- OUT = eliminated normally
- LEFT = withdrew from competition
- HOSP = eliminated due to hospitalization
- EJEC = eliminated during service

Color key
Chef was eliminated after regular nomination
Chef was eliminated after Ramsay's nomination
Chef was eliminated without nomination
Chef was eliminated from winning team
Chef was eliminated in the Cook For Your Life challenge
Chef was nominated to participate in the Cook For Your Life challenge
Chef was eliminated during service
Chef withdrew from the competition
Chef was the Best of the Best/Worst
Chef was retained after regular nomination
Chef was retained after Ramsay's nomination
Chef's nomination was voided
The winner of Hell's Kitchen
The runner-up of Hell's Kitchen

== Episodes ==
No. overall	No. in season	Title	Original release date	Prod. code	U.S. viewers (millions)
64	1	"16 Chefs Compete"	July 21, 2009	HK-601	6.09
Sixteen chefs arrived at Hell's Kitchen and were greeted Jean-Philippe at the front entrance. He showed them tips from former contestants: season three runner-up Bonnie Muirhead, tenth-place finisher Aaron Song, and season five twelfth-place finisher Colleen Cleek, to avoid making mistakes in future dinner services. A screen was then lifted to reveal chef Ramsay, who asked the chefs to enter the kitchen and start making their signature dish. He later revealed that the season's winner would become the head chef at Araxi Restaurant & Bar in Whistler, British Columbia, the host city of the 2010 Winter Olympics. Team challenge: For the first time in Hell's Kitchen, the signature dish challenge occurred as the first team challenge, and the chefs were divided into blue and red teams, with the men on the former and the women on the latter. The dishes were scored on a one-point basis, and the team with the most points would win the challenge. Neither Dave's meat nor Suzanne's fontina fonduta risotto earned a point as the former's Brussels sprouts and the latter's rice were both raw. Tek's chipotle honey-grilled shrimp scored over Louie's sausage biscuits and gravy, which tasted like "gunk", and Tennille's balsamic-glazed lamb chop scored over Joseph's roasted veal chop since the latter also plated undercooked Brussels sprouts. Additionally, he was criticized for refusing to taste the sprouts without a fork. Tony's mussels and chorizo soup scored over Amanda's margarita French toast, a simple dish that was deemed "shocking" and would have only taken three minutes to make. Jim's seared ahi tuna scored over Melinda's poached lobster tail and portobello mushrooms, which Ramsay threw out since the lobster tail was missing. Kevin's filet steak was cooked nicely, but his decision to serve it with a coffee sauce was questioned, and Ariel undercooked her duck. Neither Andy nor Lovely scored a point, leaving the score tied, two-two. Sabrina's chipotle-rubbed pork tenderloin was too spicy, and Van's foie gras with minted caramel won the challenge for the men, three-two. Reward/punishment: The men were rewarded with a three-course dinner on the patio featuring dishes from Ramsay's London West Hollywood restaurant, while the women had to clean both kitchens. Service: Season five fifth-place finisher Robert Hesse and his wife attended the opening night service. The women got off to a bad start as Lovely sent burnt fondants to the pass before the restaurant had even opened. Later, she felt overwhelmed and left the kitchen for nearly an hour. Melinda had to cook a capellini nine times as Tek did not manage to deliver an acceptable serving of scallops for her dish. Ramsay sent back Melinda's pasta for being undercooked, but she threw it away instead of just cooking it out. Ramsay then showed the entire team how much pasta was trashed and angrily asked what she was thinking, but she was too shocked to give an answer. Amanda accidentally put the salmon wraps in the freezer instead of the fridge, making it impossible to serve the five salmon dishes on order. For the men, Jim cooked the wrong amount of scallops on the first ticket, but he and Kevin recovered to get appetizers steadily moving out of the men's kitchen. When the men moved onto entrées, Louie put raw lamb in the oven without seasoning or searing the rack and also tried cooking spinach at the meat station, under the impression that he was supposed to put the entire dish together. Ramsay stopped Louie from doing some of Joseph's work and denied Joseph's request to switch stations with Louie. When Louie's lamb finally reached the pass, it was badly mangled, and Ramsay noticed the stash of lamb that Louie had wasted over the course of the night. A fed-up Ramsay ejected Louie on the spot and was forced to shut down both kitchens. The men's team was named the winning team, as they at least served a few entrées, while the women did not serve any. Automatic elimination: After Louie wasted nearly the entire supply of lamb by cutting it poorly, Ramsay lost his patience and eliminated him on the spot. Prior to Season 19 (where an individual challenge before the first dinner service that would eliminate a contestant was added to the show format), Louie was responsible for the fastest performance-based elimination in Hell's Kitchen history as well as being the fourth contestant to be eliminated during dinner service (he is still the fastest person in the show's history to be eliminated in a manner that was not premeditated by Ramsay beforehand). Ramsay gave no comment on Louie's elimination. Louie's comment: "You want me out? You want me to pack my fucking bags? I'm out. My bags are packed. He can kiss my fucking ass!" Robert's return: After both kitchens closed, Ramsay went out into the dining room to personally invite Robert back into Hell's Kitchen for another chance to win the competition. Robert accepted Ramsay's invitation and lined up with the men for the post-mortem. Elimination: The women nominated Amanda and Melinda, although Amanda thought that Lovely should have been nominated instead of her. Ramsay eliminated Melinda for her horrendous performance on the appetizers which proved to be the main reason for the women's defeat. Melinda's comment: "I am really disappointed. I really was looking forward to spending more time with Chef Ramsay. Chef Gordon Ramsay, I'd love to make you a four-course dinner and you can see exactly what kind of talent I have." Team change: After the elimination, Ramsay assigned Robert to the women's team, hoping to provide them with a boost after their abominable service. He then told Robert that while he did a good job last season, he would be treated like everyone else. Ramsay's comment: "Melinda was completely lost in space. So I sent her back to whatever planet she came from."
65	2	"15 Chefs Compete"	July 21, 2009	HK-602	6.95
Team challenge: Each chef prepared shrimp for the next night's service, with each team scoring one point for each shrimp perfectly prepared. The red team had an extra member and Lovely sat out. Sabrina scored seven as well as Amanda with even nine, followed by Tek with seven and Ariel with six. Suzanne had ten shrimp, though Robert scored an underwhelming four and Tennille only scored one, leaving the final total at 44. Andy and Van scored seven and nine respectively for the blue team, and Tony continued the momentum with nine of his own. Joseph scored five while Dave scored four, though Kevin was perfect on nine attempts to bring the blue team within one. Jim submitted seven shrimps for judging; his first one was accepted, but the next five were not. However, his last one was accepted, ultimately giving the blue team the win, 45-44. Reward/punishment: Ramsay treated the blue team to lunch at The Cannery Restaurant in Newport Beach followed by dessert on a yacht. The red team prepared shrimp cocktails for the service. Meanwhile, at the Cannery, Joseph irritated his teammates, especially Dave, with disrespectful comments towards Ramsay, that he just wanted to cook and was learning nothing by receiving rewards. Service: Ramsay had Van and Tennille cook and serve scampi in the dining room. Before service, Tony had a hard time preparing grapefruit to a point where Ramsay threatened to kick him out of the competition. Van earned Jean-Philippe's ire by running in the dining room and accidentally served customers at the other team's table, leading to heated disputes between the two. Ramsay pulled them out of the kitchen to reprimand them on their behavior. Tony cooked scallops too early and brought them up raw, forcing Kevin to take over for him on the fish station. For the red team, Robert burned shallots for a risotto, but he and Suzanne managed to get appetizers out. Tennille fell behind in the dining room which backed up her kitchen, and then faced not only Ramsay's anger, but also her team's, for serving undercooked shrimp to a woman who was pregnant. Lovely repeatedly burned her fish and did not realize that the gas on the stove was turned off. Kevin again took over the fish station after Tony tried to cook a halibut without seasoning it, but he served it raw as well. Andy then undercooked the chicken and attempted to quickly fry it off after slicing it. Sabrina also served undercooked chicken despite Suzanne's warning, and after she burned the refire, the service was deemed a lost cause. Ramsay ordered the chefs to make shrimp cocktails for the diners (since they do not require any cooking), before shutting down both kitchens and declaring both teams losers. Elimination: Ariel announced the red team's nominees as Tennille and Lovely. Ramsay then asked Joseph who the blue team's nominations were, but he flippantly responded, "they can speak for themselves, they know who they are". Ramsay did not accept this answer and asked Joseph a second time for the blue team's nominations. Joseph announced Tony and Andy as the nominees with no reason as to why they were nominated. When Ramsay asked Joseph a third time, Joseph angrily replied that they chose as a group and there was no need to have peer pressure from anybody because they were men. A fed-up Ramsay stepped forward and attempted to get Joseph to follow directions, but Joseph instead retorted that he was not a "bitch", and when several members of the red team scolded Joseph for getting hostile, he rudely told them to keep their mouths shut. Ramsay finally lost his patience and yelled, "I ask the fucking questions, you give the fucking answers!", causing Joseph to take off his jacket, walk right up to Ramsay and ask for a fight. The episode then ended on a cliffhanger.
66	3	"14 Chefs Compete"	July 28, 2009	HK-603	7.04
Joseph's disqualification: As Joseph was walking aggressively towards Ramsay to try and fight him, two members of the crew stepped in to intervene in case of any physical contact. While Joseph attempted to convince Ramsay to step outside of camera range to fight while hurling a barrage of insults at him, Ramsay stood his ground, calmly told Joseph he had no respect, and disqualified him from the competition. Joseph's comment: "I don't need this or that. I don't need some limey fucking prick talking to me like that. Without skipping a beat, go back home, I'll work. Anybody would fucking hire me to work in their kitchen, and they'd be proud to have me there. Fuck him! Fuck him!" Ramsay's Comment: "What an idiot! Total, total shame!" Elimination: Ramsay went back to business and asked Kevin to finally and civilly deal with the nominations. He nominated Tony and Andy properly and with valid reasons. Ramsay, while feeling Lovely had been the worst performer of the night, eliminated Tony for failing to control his station and for giving an exceptionally unprofessional plea when compared to the standard for contestants to give (one of his main reasons for continuing was that he "loved to cook and make things taste really good"). Joseph received no elimination sequence, but his jacket and burned photo could be seen next to Lovely's and later Tek's. As for Tony, Ramsay did not give a comment, but his jacket was hung and his picture was burned. Tony's comment: "I proved myself by being here, you know. I mean, I didn't get a chance to shine, so out I go. But I still think I have the palate of a god." Team change: Ramsay then returned Robert back to the men as they were down two members. Team challenge: The chefs were awakened at 2 A.M. with lights and sirens from fire trucks. There was no fire, but they were told to serve the firefighters a pasta meal consisting of chicken alfredo, meatball marinara, and a garlic bread appetizer; the first to serve all firefighters on its side would win. Andy and Lovely had trouble cooking garlic bread. However, Lovely quickly recovered with Ariel's help but Andy continued to slow down the rest of his team by only using two of the five available ovens. Eventually, Andy's bread made it out to the dining room. The women were far ahead, but the men caught up when Sabrina did not put enough chicken in the alfredo and Tek had a marinara sent back for an undercooked meatball. Both teams made it to the final ticket simultaneously, but the women won in a close finish. Reward/punishment: The women rode a helicopter and received spa treatments at the Pacific Waters Spa at the Hyatt Regency Hotel in Huntington Beach, while the men had to clean the fire trucks, followed by the dining room. During the team punishment, Dave tore his FCR and fractured his wrist when his arm got stuck between a truck's door and step, and soon after, Kevin tripped on the stairs and sprained both ankles, resulting in both men requiring medical treatment. After receiving their treatments, they both opted to stay in the competition. Service: Ramsay assigned Dave (who volunteered) and Lovely (who did not) to be waiters. Lovely was criticized for her general slowness, taking 42 minutes to bring in an order, and was slowed even further when a customer requested a rare Balmoral wine, which she collected from Ramsay's office. Tennille used too much oil in her scallops and spilled oil on the grill after she got overwhelmed by her teammates and Ramsay yelling at her, causing a fire, but she managed to retake control after a pep talk from Ramsay, and had no further problems in service. Andy, who was on garnish, attempted to help Robert on fish but worsened the situation by trying to cook too many scallops in one small pan. Ramsay told Van to stop shouting because he was confusing his team, but was impressed with his risotto. Kevin also impressed with his performance on the meat station, despite his injured ankle. Robert was scolded for running in the kitchen and talking back after serving poor scallops. Amanda brought only eight lamb chops for three orders and flabbergasted Ramsay by incorrectly answering how many she needed. Both teams managed to complete service; the men reached their final ticket first, but Robert caused a 12-minute delay when he forgot to cook the salmon, allowing the women to finish first. However, the men ultimately won the service after receiving 83% of the customers' cards, compared to the women's 81%. Elimination: Ramsay named Ariel as best of the worst and told her to pick two nominees for elimination. She selected Lovely and Tennille. Ramsay indicated that he expected Amanda to be nominated rather than Lovely, but allowed the nominations to stand. With two chefs eliminated after the previous service earlier in this episode, Ramsay spared Lovely and Tennille, then tested Amanda's math skills once again. He also played off Joseph's diatribe by reminding the chefs, "I'm nobody's bitch." Everybody laughed and went back to the dorms. Ramsay's comment: "Lovely and Tennille may think they've just received a gift, but what I have in store for them tomorrow will have them running for the door."
67	4	"13 Chefs Compete"	August 4, 2009	HK-604	6.74
Team challenge: Ramsay paired up the chefs (in particular, those whom he felt were not getting along well with each other) to make sausage links by hand in order to improve their teamwork skills. The first team to make six strings of sausages that meet Ramsay's specifications would win. Ramsay chose Amanda to sit out as the women had an extra member. The men struggled, with one pair, Jim and Robert, producing nothing. The majority of the women were perfect, with only Ariel and Sabrina producing a line too thin, and the women ultimately won the challenge 6-4. Reward/punishment: The women visited the Old World Village in Huntington Beach and celebrated Oktoberfest. The men cleaned up the dorms and this took a mental toll on Robert, who had yet to win a single challenge himself. When sous-chef Scott reprimanded him for showing passion now that he did not in the challenge, Robert broke his broom in a fit of anger, reminding everyone how he almost died last season. Also, Dave received a call from his doctor, informing him that his broken wrist would require a cast that would make his left arm essentially unusable, and he had to go to the hospital to put the cast on for two weeks. Dave contemplated quitting the competition, and after seeking advice from Ramsay, he decided to stay. Service: Drew Lachey and John O'Hurley were among the red team's diners while the blue team's diners include Melinda Clarke, Kristy Swanson, Dwight Freeney and Tom Green. Christopher "Kid" Reid was also in attendance. Jim and Ariel were assigned to the dining room to prepare an Amuse-bouche appetizer, but Jim's slowness and inattentiveness hindered his team. John O'Hurley's capellini was sent back to the kitchen after Tek added too much salt, and she needed Tennille's help on the refire. Lovely sent bland garnishes intended for Drew Lachey's table and had trouble keeping track of the orders. Andy's lamb for Tom Green was undercooked and despite Robert doing well on the appetizers, Ramsay criticized him for yelling at Andy to the extent that the diners could all hear him. Suzanne was lectured for serving lamb chops with more bone than meat. Dave returned for service after being released from the hospital with a new cast and was assigned to desserts, with Ramsay complimenting him in the middle of service for working faster than anyone in the kitchen despite being injured. On the last ticket, Ariel overcooked the tagliatelle, while Andy sent up raw chicken but bounced back after Sous Chef Scott shouted at him for more chicken. The men won the service after Van served the garnish before Lovely did. In the post-mortem that followed, Suzanne asked Ramsay for a "play-by-play" on the disappointing loss, but was shut down cold. Ramsay also pointed out that despite only having "eleven hands" (due to Dave's wrist fracture, and compared to the women's fourteen), the men were still able to complete the service. Elimination: Sabrina was named “Best of the Worst”, and nominated Lovely and Tek for elimination. Before Ramsay made his decision, he sarcastically asked Suzanne who she would send home (as he was annoyed by her asking for an explanation as to the red team's loss during the post-mortem); she nonetheless answered the question honestly by choosing Lovely. Ramsay agreed and eliminated Lovely for her slowness, consistently terrible performance, constant excuses for her shortcomings, and lack of improvement over the course of four services. However, he gave a stern warning to Tek, saying she was on her last chance. Lovely's comment: "The diva has to leave, but I'm gonna take all this experience, all these tough times, and I'm gonna keep moving forward. It's not too lovely leaving Hell's Kitchen." Ramsay's comment: "If people were named for their cooking, her name wouldn't be Lovely. It would be Useless."
68	5	"12 Chefs Compete"	August 11, 2009	HK-605	6.92
Team challenge: For the special service, Marine Staff Sergeant Otis James had just returned home from a tour of duty in Iraq. To celebrate his return, Ramsay would be serving a dinner for his family and friends that included Otis' favorite foods, such as soul food, shrimp, and lobster. Each team had 45 minutes to cook one appetizer and two entrées, using pointers given by Otis' wife Latasha as a guide. However, she only gave the instructions to Robert and Suzanne, who would have to give the info to the rest of their teams. Robert proved to be a strong leader and effectively relayed the information and coordinated his team, leading Kevin to praise his leadership. However, Suzanne failed to mention any of Otis' likes or dislikes to her team and instead pushed for dishes she wanted to make based on the information, while ignoring her team's suggestions. Mrs. James then determined, by taste, which dishes Otis would like best. Ariel's Caesar salad with baked shrimp beat Kevin's seafood style bouillabaisse on the appetizer, but Andy's four cheese macaroni and fried catfish beat Amanda's bacon wrapped filet after the bacon fell apart, and more crucially, Robert correctly remembered that Otis preferred grilled lobster, whereas Suzanne served a poached lobster with seafood pasta. This gave the men the challenge win. Reward/punishment: The men spent the day flying in a mock dogfight with professional aviators from Air Combat USA while the women prepared the dining room for the celebration with Ramsay's wife Tana giving specification help. Additionally, Tennille was angry at Suzanne for most of the punishment for misleading the entire team by not offering clues such as "soul food", which would have jibed with her idea to make a jambalaya, which Suzanne shut down cold. Service: Tana opened the service, and featured Otis' favorite foods as well the challenge winning dishes on the menu. The men had a near perfect service, with the only problems being Jim getting overwhelmed on the grilling station, due to the large number of surf & turf dishes on order, and struggling to recite the orders when questioned by Ramsay. However, he got away with this when Ramsay became distracted by a burning pan on Van's station, which allowed Kevin to quickly help Jim get reorganized. After that, entrèes went out with no problems, although Andy and Kevin irked Dave and Jim respectively by giving unwanted help on their stations. The women started off well enough on appetizers, although Sabrina was slow serving a stuffed mushroom and then served it cold but quickly fixed it. However, the women completely fell apart on entrées as Tek repeatedly served raw and burnt steaks and also forgot a hamburger on one ticket. When Tek finally managed to cook some acceptable steaks, the order still could not be sent because Amanda had undercooked the lobster. A frustrated Ramsay called all the men in, except for Kevin who was on desserts, to help the women after they had completed their entrées. Ramsay named the men the clear winners while berating the women for failing to send a single entrée while the men completed theirs with injured members. Elimination: The women decided to nominate Tennille and Tek. Tennille, however, thought she improved in that night's service and wanted Amanda nominated instead. Ramsay agreed and called all three up, but quickly sent Tennille back in line after she pled her case. Although Ramsay felt Amanda lacked the emotional strength to win the competition, he ultimately eliminated Tek for being a consistently poor performer; in particular, her steak fiasco ruined any chance at all for the women to even complete service. Tek's comment: "Life is not over for me after Hell's Kitchen because I am a crazy, badass girl, and I'm a hell of a lot better cook than Chef Ramsay saw." Ramsay's comment: "I kept on waiting for Tek to emerge. She couldn't even handle her station. Tek had a total meltdown."
69	6	"11 Chefs Compete"	August 18, 2009	HK-606	7.49
When the women went back to the dorms, Ramsay had a quick private talk with Amanda. Concerned about Amanda's ability to handle the pressure of being in Hell's Kitchen, he told her that her performance in services needed to improve quickly. Challenge: Each team had 45 minutes to create a low-calorie meal, consisting of an appetizer, an entrèe, and a dessert, with the entire meal containing less than 700 calories; the team with the most items selected by Ramsay would be the winner. The women did well under Sabrina's leadership, due to her experience making low calorie food, and managed to finish with 694 calories between their dishes. However, the men struggled to stay within the 700 calorie limit and wasted a lot of time trying to reduce it after learning they were 300 calories over. This led them to cut their portions down and eventually left them with barely enough time to cook, having to settle on 597 calories between their dishes. After cooking, the team's presented their dishes to Ramsay for judging. Both Tennille's seared scallops with mango chutney and Kevin and Robert's shrimp salad scored on appetizers. Ariel and Sabrina's cottage cheese and mushroom stuffed pork cutlet beat Jim and Van's pork cutlet with soba noodles and broccolini, which was not only dry but also trimmed down to such an extent that Ramsay called it a child portion. Amanda and Suzanne's fruit bowl with lemon and coconut milk beat Dave and Andy's crêpe with a fruit compote and yogurt cream, which Ramsay described as "the crap [one eats] after a heart bypass or an ulcer operation," clinching a 3-1 win for the women. Reward/punishment: The women were rewarded with a day at Venice Beach and played volleyball with Annett Davis and Jean-Philippe. On their return to the dorms, each member also received a gift basket which included a Vitamix blender and Ramsay's book, Gordon Ramsay's Healthy Appetite. The men spent the day prepping both sides for that night's service. They also had to drive a Conference Bike up a hill to a supermarket to pick up ingredients for the women's menu. This proved costly for Robert, as the operation of this vehicle was more than he could take; after returning to Hell's Kitchen, he was rushed to the hospital, experiencing shortness of breath and dizziness. As a result of this outcome, Robert was not able to participate in that night's service. Service: The women's challenge dishes were included as specials on the service menu that night. The men had a terrible start; Jim backed up the kitchen on the first table with peppery and bland risotto. After Jim again served an improperly seasoned risotto, sous-chef Scott took over the station, which allowed the men to finally get appetizers out. However, on entrées, Dave got yelled at by Scott for cooking the wrong garnish, and both he and Kevin struggled to communicate properly. Andy failed to pay attention to Ramsay's orders and repeatedly undercooked and overcooked the halibut. In the women's kitchen, Ariel boiled the scallops but managed to recover. Tennille cooked spinach ahead of order and was almost eliminated on the spot after talking back to Ramsay over not making enough mashed potatoes; after a heated argument with Ramsay in the corridor, she promised to hold her tongue and get the job done, and Ramsay allowed her to return. Sabrina forgot to cook a portion of chicken, poorly sliced it, and had pork returned from the dining room for being undercooked. After a raw lamb that Sabrina thought was medium well was sent back from the red dining room, Ramsay ended service and deemed both teams losers. This loss marks the worst start for any team in Hell’s Kitchen history, with the women having six consecutive service losses. Elimination: Each team had to nominate one person for elimination. The women nominated Sabrina, who wanted Tennille to go up instead. The men settled on nominating Andy, though he convinced them to nominate Robert, who was absent from service. Upon discovering this, Ramsay said that Robert would not be eligible for elimination, but he would be automatically eliminated if he did not return for the next dinner service, forcing the men to pick Andy. To the shock of the blue team, Ramsay ultimately eliminated Jim, feeling that he was not passionate or vocal enough to be an effective leader in the kitchen, and telling him, "You're not the Tin Man and I'm not the fucking Wizard of Oz. Give me your jacket, please." Jim's comment: "Just not fair, you know? I gave it my all every day, but I guess it's not what he was looking for. Chef Ramsay wanted to see me give him back some fire, and that's just not me. So at the end of the day, when my head hits the pillow, I know that I never wavered on who I am." Ramsay's comment: "At times I thought Jim was sleepwalking, but then I realized he just had no passion. And that's why it was time for him to leave Hell's Kitchen."
70	7	"10 Chefs Compete"	August 25, 2009	HK-607	7.77
Team challenge: Each team rolled a die which had letters on twelve sides. Whichever letter it showed, the chef had to name an ingredient starting with that letter. (Note: In the dice roll challenge, 24 spots were allocated in the letters of the alphabet (12 letters each which are given two spots).) They then had to cook using the ingredients. (Note: For the women, Suzanne rolled on R and went for rabbit, Amanda rolled on H and went for haricot verts (green beans), Tennille rolled P and went for potato, Sabrina rolled G and went for garlic and Ariel rolled H and went for ham hock. As for the men, with Robert still in the hospital, Andy had an extra roll. He rolled H and went for haddock, Dave rolled F and reluctantly went for figs, Van rolled A and went for angel hair pasta, Kevin rolled A and went for apples and Andy rolled T and went for tomato.) The men won the challenge with their braised haddock with fig and tomato sauce and angel hair pasta, because the women put so much garlic in their puree, it "obliterated everything else", despite Tennille having warned Ariel to make it less pungent. Reward/punishment: The men flew to Las Vegas where they toured the city in a limousine and then had an overnight stay in a high-class suite at the Palms Casino Resort. The women had to unload and unpack boxes of food being delivered to Hell's Kitchen, including wine for Jean-Phillippe. In addition, they had to perform duties in the kitchen as well as cleaning and prepping for the next service. The women were awoken at 1:15 AM to accept yet another delivery of food. Service: Just before service began, Robert returned. The men felt that the team dynamic worked better without Robert and snubbed him, while Robert wandered around doing nothing for the pre-service before finally going upstairs to eat a cheeseburger. For the first time ever, each team had a chef's table on their side of the kitchen, which remains in the kitchens throughout the series. Ramsay assigned Dave and Van to take the orders for the chef's table, but Dave did not let the guests choose their appetizers while Van struggled to explain what the entrées were; even worse, two of Van's sea bass were returned to the pass with pieces of plastic wrap in them. Robert cut lamb chops smaller than the bone itself and had a messy work station. After Robert served raw rabbit, Ramsay yelled at Kevin for not stopping to regroup with the team and shut down the men's kitchen. The women had a decent service with the only problems being Sabrina cooking garnish in a dirty pan, until Ramsay stopped her, and Ariel holding up Amanda's fish due to not having the pasta ready in time. The women finished their service, serving both chef's tables, giving them their first and only dinner service victory of the season. Since the guests at the chef's table liked Dave's appetizers (even though he had refused to let them choose their order), he was named “Best of the Worst” and told to nominate two of his teammates for elimination. Elimination: Dave nominated Robert and Van, but Ramsay also nominated Andy, feeling that he had yet to show that he was capable of winning Hell's Kitchen. Ramsay first sent Van back in line and then, after heated pleas from Andy and Robert, eliminated Robert for having had more chances than anyone remaining, with his latest poor performance costing him his stay. (Note: Robert and Sabrina's elimination were played in a retrospective montage in their exits. They are the first chefs who failed to receive black jackets to get a clip since Rachel Brown had one on season 2.) Before leaving, Robert said that his culinary career was not over, to which Ramsay replied, "I can't wait to see you" and thanked him for his effort. Robert's comment: "I left Hell's Kitchen last time because of my health. It was an honor just to be invited to come back. I felt like I was under a lot of pressure. I may have lost it a few times. And I fought back. I damn sure say that Gordon Ramsay and Hell's Kitchen changed my life for the better. But I'm going home and just focusing on my career and my health, and they better watch out because three times is the charm." Ramsay's comment: "Robert's closing plea was quite entertaining, but I'm not looking for a performer. I'm looking for a head chef, and Robert's not that guy."
71	8	"9 Chefs Compete"	September 1, 2009	HK-608	7.63
Team challenge: The chefs were challenged to a blind taste test. Since the women had an extra member, Ramsay chose Tennille to sit out. Each chef was then given four ingredients to taste. The team with the most ingredients identified correctly would win the challenge. Ariel scored two over Van's one, Suzanne scored two over Dave's one, while Kevin and Sabrina each scored one. Andy and Amanda each scored one, giving the women a 6-4 win after Andy guessed his second to last ingredient wrong. Reward/punishment: The women had lunch in the dark at Opaque at the V Lounge in Santa Monica with Ramsay. The men made sorbet for that night's service, took in a delivery of fruit, and cleaned the glasses for the sorbet. They were also served a smoothie made of leftover duck and risotto for lunch. Service: Ariel served the sorbet tableside since the women had an extra member, while the men had to have anyone who had spare time serve it. The men were able to complete their service with few mistakes. Van served up a bland risotto but quickly fixed it, however, it was met with a mixed response in the dining room. Andy briefly confused the rest of the kitchen by not communicating what tables were next, but Ramsay quickly got the men back on track. Additionally, Andy ran out of mashed potatoes for the last few remaining orders, but Dave was able to successfully cook up a new batch quickly despite his injured arm. For the women, Suzanne cooked her sea bass early, putting pressure on Sabrina to quickly get out the lamb, which ended up undercooked. Ramsay temporarily removed Sabrina from the kitchen and forced her to eat the lamb. Amanda made too much tagliatelle but managed to recover. Later, Suzanne fell behind on sea bass, and Ramsay forced them to redo the table after the sea bass crumbled. Amanda jumped in to help Suzanne on fish, though when the halibut was undercooked, Suzanne pinned the blame on Amanda. Both teams completed their service, but the men were declared the winners, with Ramsay praising Dave in particular for his performance. Elimination: Tennille was named “Best of the Worst” and had to nominate two of her teammates for elimination. She immediately chose Suzanne but deliberated between Sabrina and Amanda, ultimately choosing Sabrina, but Ramsay also called down Amanda and ultimately eliminated her. Although both Sabrina and Suzanne made major errors in service, Ramsay felt Amanda was too polite and a far weaker performer overall than either of them. Amanda's comment: "I don't agree with Chef Ramsay's decision. I really think Suzanne should've gone home tonight. But I'm definitely gonna keep cooking for the rest of my life and be the best chef ever." Ramsay's comment: "Amanda was a sweet girl, but sweet girls don't make great head chefs."
72	9	"8 Chefs Compete"	September 8, 2009	HK-609	7.97
Team challenge: Each team had 20 minutes to make four crêpes, one for breakfast, lunch, dinner, and dessert, to be judged by Ramsay and Jean-Philippe. Ariel scored over Van in the breakfast round but Andy scored over Tennille in the lunch round. Both Kevin and Suzanne scored in the dinner round but the women won the challenge 3-2 after Sabrina's poached pears and chocolate ganache crêpe were deemed delicious while Dave's crêpe was so soggy that Ramsay compared it to "a plate of diarrhea" and refused to taste it. Reward/punishment: The women learned how to be mime artists and had lunch at La Cachette Bistro in Santa Monica where they were served foie gras. The men prepared both kitchens for a French-themed service and had cow tongue, stale baguettes, and head cheese for lunch. Service: Prior to the start of service, Andy accidentally sliced off his fingertips while using a mandoline to slice potatoes, requiring medical assistance, but he returned at the start of service. Suzanne undercooked and overcooked the lamb and sliced meat too early. Sabrina also underseasoned the risotto, forcing Ramsay to compare it to Dave's risotto, and she was reprimanded again for not seasoning the frog legs. When Ramsay caught Andy putting too much dressing in a truffle salad, Andy pointed to the injury to his left hand (which he uses to accomplish most tasks), but Ramsay reminded him that Dave and Kevin have been injured for weeks and neither complained about it. Dave cooked several of Andy's appetizers in addition to his regular assignment on the meat station, leading Ramsay to joke that Dave "cooked ten thousand times better with one hand". After Andy struggled to make the crêpes, Kevin helped him out, only for Ramsay to kick Andy out of the kitchen for not doing any work. In the red kitchen, Suzanne overcooked an entire table's worth of lamb, leading Ramsay to kick her and Sabrina out. Ariel and Tennille completed the red team's service with help from sous-chef Heather. Ramsay, however, refused to declare a winner since both teams were missing members at the end of the service, a first in the show's history (except for those eliminated during service); this would happen more frequently in later seasons. Elimination: Both teams had to work together to come up with two nominees for elimination, which turned out to be Suzanne and Andy. Ramsay eliminated Andy for his inconsistent performances and numerous excuses for his issues, but praised him for having a big heart and urged him to stop panicking. Ramsay also called up Sabrina and told her to step up. Andy's comment: "It's unfortunate how I went out, because I was getting stronger and stronger every day, and I felt that I was making a comeback." Team change: Ariel and Tennille vocally asked for Suzanne to be removed from their team. Instead of eliminating Suzanne, Ramsay told her to take off her jacket, and informed her she would be joining the men, starting in the next episode. Ramsay's comment: "Andy has had good and bad moments in Hell's Kitchen. Unfortunately, most of them were bad."
73	10	"7 Chefs Compete"	September 22, 2009	HK-610	6.78
Team challenge: Ramsay flew to Whistler overnight. Via a video connection, he gave a tour of the Araxi restaurant, and introduced this episode's challenge: each team had 2½ hours (the amount of time it would Ramsay take to fly back to Los Angeles) to prepare three entrees using 15 ingredients, all native to Canada, without repeating any. In the red kitchen, Tennille and Ariel worked on a dish they thought was lamb, but was actually venison, something Sabrina knew but neglected to inform them about. Former Olympic Medalists Sasha Cohen and Jonny Moseley judge each entree. Kevin scored both points on the salmon entrée over Ariel, but Tennille scored both on the venison entrée over Dave, despite misidentifying the venison as lamb. Van's grilled shrimp with braised kale scored over Sabrina's lamb with mushroom brulee, giving a 4-2 win for the blue team. Reward/punishment: The blue team had lunch with Ramsay at the Campanile restaurant where chef Mark Peele showed them stylish versions of everyday dishes, including a grilled cheese sandwich. They also received a "souvenir" – a tuque with Whistler's logo emblazoned upon it. The red team was sent to a farm to do various chores including milking the cows and cleaning the pig pen. Service: Before dinner service, Ramsay tore up the dinner menu and had each team create a new menu, with their own personal flair. While the blue team had no problem creating their menu, on the red team, Sabrina shot down most suggestions though came up with nothing herself. Tennille's ideas were deemed too complicated, so Ariel took responsibility for the majority of the menu, with Sabrina having no input. In the blue kitchen, Van sent too many scallops for a table and then burned some scallops. He also spilled the sauce for his fish at the pass and only irritated Ramsay more by laughing about it. Dave aggravated his arm injury after lifting a heavy pan, and despite having the medic called over, he chose to fight through the rest of the service. Ariel had several of her ravioli dishes returned for being undercooked, and Ramsay berated her for acting laid back about it. Tennille also needed Ariel's help cooking the Swiss chard, which she had never made before, and then served it with too much pepper. Sabrina slowed her kitchen on entrèes, and after she and Van both served undercooked halibut, Ramsay ended service and declared both teams losers for the second time in a row. (Note: The red team set the worst competitive record of any red team in the history of Hell's Kitchen in terms of dinner services. They were victorious only once in ten services, losing five outright and four jointly with the blue team.) Elimination: Each team was asked to nominate one person for elimination. Dave nominated Van, while acknowledging Suzanne as the weakest cook on the blue team. The red team nominated Sabrina, who was on the chopping block for the third straight service. Ramsay eliminated Sabrina for her downward spiral in the last few services, but he praised her for her big heart and dedication. Sabrina's comment: "I came in, red lipstick, makeup on, hair did, big bitch on the block, but once Chef, like, brings you off your pedestal, it is really hard. I expected it to be easy. I was wrong. It's very difficult, but I am so proud that I got this far. I am really looking forward to getting back to my own kitchen, seeing my own staff, and getting pretty again." Ramsay's comment: "Sabrina wanted to be the head chef in Whistler. Now, what she needs to do is take those red lips and whistle on out of here."
74	11	"6 Chefs Compete"	September 22, 2009	HK-611	6.98
The remaining six chefs woke up to gifts congratulating them on making it to the final six. The chefs revealed their black team chef jackets. Team challenge: The chefs were arranged in pairs (Ariel and Van, Dave and Suzanne, and Kevin and Tennille) and had 30 minutes to recreate one of Ramsay's signature dishes based on taste alone, and Ramsay himself would judge the dishes. All three pairs correctly identified the turbot but missed the puree, which was white onion. Kevin and Tennille were disqualified immediately for failing to plate their calamari, while Dave and Suzanne won the challenge for being the only pair to correctly identify passion fruit sauce, as Ariel and Van used starfruit and Kevin and Tennille chose grapefruit. Suzanne annoyed the others by being smug about the win, and Dave was particularly uncomfortable about going on the reward with her. Reward/punishment: Dave and Suzanne had lunch with Ramsay, cooked by Hell's Kitchen season 4 winner Christina Machamer at Ramsay's London West Hollywood restaurant. Suzanne asked Christina many questions, shooting down Dave's attempts to talk to Christina. The other chefs prepped the kitchen and dining room for a special "couples" dinner service. Service: Kevin served salad and Porterhouse steaks table side. However, he was unable to serve some of his salads as Suzanne mistakenly thought only two tortellini came per portion and gave inconsistent timings for the refire, which required Kevin to make the salad at the table more than once. The kitchen only got further backed up when Ramsay caught Van sweating into the scallops. Appetizers eventually caught up with entrèes, while Van also undercooked his halibut and Ariel burned her lettuce garnish. Ramsay, visibly losing his sanity, walked out of the kitchen with sous-chef Scott, a first in the series. Tennille and Kevin took control of the kitchen. Ariel continued to struggle to stay in sync with the others, and Suzanne annoyed her teammates by refusing to plate dishes thinking she would get the blame if they were poorly done. Ramsay returned to the kitchen to kick out Suzanne, Ariel and Van to the dorms, leaving Kevin, Dave and Tennille to finish the service themselves. Van became infuriated, and even though Ariel attempted to calm him down, Van walked out of the dorms. After Dave, Kevin and Tennille finished the service, Ramsay asked them to nominate two of the other three chefs for elimination. Elimination: Dave, Kevin, and Tennille quickly agreed on Suzanne as the first choice but were divided between Van and Ariel for the second. Dave announced Suzanne and Ariel as the nominees, but Tennille told Ramsay she thought Van should go up, so Ramsay called the three nominees to step forward. Ramsay eliminated Van for his back-to-back failures on the fish station, but told him he can cook, and that he should let the food do the talking instead of him. Van's comment: "When I came into Hell's Kitchen, I came in guns blazing. I kicked ass on the signature dish. But there's a lot more to it in Hell's Kitchen than just cooking. Then the stress got to me. But I had fun while I was here. The main lesson I've learned about myself: when you get down, don't stay down. I want to go out here with my head up. I'm gonna be the man one day. Van is gonna be the man." Ramsay's comment: "Van may be a poissonier, but his performance on fish was anything but 'Van-tastic'."
75	12	"5 Chefs Compete"	September 29, 2009	HK-612	6.64
Challenge: For the first individual challenge, each chef had 45 minutes to cook an entrée that not only tasted the best, but also was the most appealing to the eye. The editorial staff of Bon Appétit magazine judged the visual aspects, with the top two dishes judged by Ramsay and Bon Appétit editor in chief Barbara Fairchild for taste. Ariel's prosciutto-wrapped John Dory dish and Kevin's Caribbean Sea Bass were the top two, with no consensus to as which was the best. Reward/punishment: Kevin and Ariel joined Fairchild and Ramsay at the Shutters on the Beach Hotel in Santa Monica for a photo shoot for a future issue of Bon Appétit and their entrees would be featured in that night's service. The others picked up trash off a stretch of road "adopted" by Hell's Kitchen, dressed up in jumpsuits, and transported on a prison bus. They also cleaned up the Hell's Kitchen complex. Dave aggravated his broken arm while sweeping the entrance, requiring him to wrap it in ice. Kevin, upon witnessing this, tried to convince Dave to leave the competition, but Dave again remained determined to stay until the end. Service: The final five had a very rocky service. Tennille twice overcooked risotto, due to not noticing that she was using overcooked rice. When Ramsay did notice, Kevin confessed that he overcooked the rice during prep, and Ramsay berated him for his lack of standards. Luckily, Suzanne was able to find some properly cooked rice, which allowed the risotto to stay on the menu for the night. However, Suzanne burned scallops and undercooked Ariel's John Dory dish, and Ariel undercooked chicken and poorly sliced lamb. Most tables in that night's service were served incomplete with the final five struggling to earn Ramsay's approval with their dishes. Eventually, service was completed, but as Ramsay expected this standard a long time ago, he merely said "Big deal." Elimination: The team nominated Ariel and Suzanne for elimination for their many mistakes during service. Ramsay eliminated Suzanne, feeling that she was on seemingly unsalvageable downward spiral, and had run out of chances after being nominated for the fourth time, much to the relief of Tennille and the remaining three chefs. Ramsay told Tennille she dodged a bullet as she deserved to be nominated. Suzanne's comment: "This experience has been very enlightening, and I've learned a lot about, you know, my strengths and my weaknesses. I didn't have many personal relationships with many people. I really threw everybody under the bus tonight. And I realized that my major flaw was creating this distance with my teammates. I'm sure everybody's happy that I'm gone. I bet they're over there, like, giggling and laughing like schoolgirls." Ramsay's comment: "Suzanne had a red jacket, she had a blue jacket, she had a black jacket. Now, she has no jacket."
76	13	"4 Chefs Compete"	October 6, 2009	HK-613	7.43
Challenge: The chefs awakened and were greeted by Little Gordon, Ramsay's child version. After Little Gordon gave the contestants a brief show, the real Ramsay came in the dining room and gave them their next individual challenge. They had one hour to cook 80 portions of a vegetarian dish. However, after the chefs had cooked their dishes, it was revealed that they would be serving them to children. Each of the children was served one portion of each contestants' dish. Tennille's mushroom-stuffed eggplant was voted the best by 55% of the kids, making her the winner of the challenge. Dave's polenta tower with goat cheese and roasted peppers finished second and Ariel's vegetarian lasagne finished third, while 40% voted Kevin's Asian crepe with beet carpaccio as the worst. Reward/punishment: Tennille was rewarded with a makeover in Beverly Hills, followed by a special sushi lunch with Ramsay personally prepared by world renowned sushi chef Nobu Matsuhisa at Nobu in Los Angeles. At the end of the meal, Matsuhisa gifted her with a brand-new set of authentic Japanese knives designed by Rokusaburo Michiba and manufactured by J.A. Henckels. Ariel, Dave, and Kevin cleaned up the mess left behind by the 80 children, which included scraping gum off the bottom of the tables. Service: Kevin started off the service at the appetizers station, preparing perfect risottos. When Dave's wrist injury acted up once during service, Ramsay directed Dave to see a medic, though Dave assured him his wrist was fine and got his lamb accepted. Tennille struggled badly, serving rubbery scallops while burning sea bass and undercooking halibut. When the other chefs asked for cooking times, Tennille did not respond, before eventually giving mixed signals. However, after Ramsay gave her a warning in the pantry, she made a comeback and her subsequent cooking was perfect. Eventually, the service was completed "flawless". Elimination: Just after service, Ramsay considered eliminating Dave because of his continuous pain, though Dave requested that if he was to be eliminated, it be on his abilities as a chef and not on his injured wrist. Ramsay then announced that there would not be any nominations, eliminating Tennille immediately for being the only chef to struggle during service. After Tennille broke down in tears, Ramsay continued to praise her during her farewell, calling her the biggest comeback this season, having previously told her no chef had ever cooked meat so well. (Note: Tennille's elimination is the first time Ramsay has eliminated a chef in the post-mortem after service. This has only happened four times since, twice in Season 13, once in Season 23 and once in Season 24.) The remaining chefs were likewise upset upon saying their farewells, in particular Ariel, whom Tennille had been on a team with since the beginning. Tennille's comment: "When I first came to Hell's Kitchen, I knew absolutely nothing about fine dining. It's hard not to let your nerves get to you. When I got into it with Chef Ramsay... But I fought back. When somebody kicks you, stomps you, throws you down, and says you're not good enough, never give up. Never give up. Chef Ramsay comes across people left and right. For him to take the time to say, 'Hey, you, you're a great chef. Keep going,' that's all he needed to say." The three remaining chefs went to the dorm rooms to relax and Ramsay called them downstairs for more business to attend to. Ramsay surprised Dave with his fiancée and sister, followed by Ariel's fiancé and mother, and Kevin's wife and son so they could each spend time with their loved ones.
77	14	"3 Chefs Compete"	October 13, 2009	HK-614	8.04
Challenge: The chefs each chose a dome at random to reveal a type of ethnic cuisine they would have to cook in 45 minutes. Ariel drew Chinese, Kevin drew Mexican, and Dave drew Indian. Each of their dishes were then judged by three chefs, one of each nationality: Eddie Wong, Thomas Ortega and Vikas Khanna. Ariel's lychee and plum marinated duck breast atop noodles received mixed reviews; while the flavors were felt to be decent, the sauce was too thin. Kevin's orange and cumin rubbed pork tenderloin received favorable reviews, but Ortega expressed his disappointment when he found out Kevin forgot to plate a Mexican mole chocolate sauce with the dish. Dave's dish, a seared pork tenderloin and ming bean purée, immediately received Khanna's criticism for serving an animal considered taboo in large parts of India due to its Muslim population (something Dave had not been aware of when preparing the dish), but despite this, he won the challenge after receiving votes from all three chefs. Reward/punishment: Dave joined his sister and fiancée for a lunch at the chef's table cooked by the judging panel, and he also won a complete set of Demeyere Cookware, the same cookware Hell's Kitchen uses. Meanwhile, Ariel and Kevin polished the silverware and then prepared for the night's service. Service: Each contestant took turns at the pass, in which they were tested on their leadership, as well as their ability to spot intentional mistakes introduced by sous-chefs Scott and Heather. Kevin caught a sea bass instead of halibut but was bogged down by Ariel's lamb, and despite Ariel having warned Kevin that the lamb should not be separated from the bone, Kevin still had her prepare a new one. Dave's aggressive leadership was initially successful, but he missed spinach puree instead of asparagus puree in a risotto as well as a raw tuna, forcing Ramsay to pull him aside and tell him to improve. He later managed to spot weaknesses in the other dishes, earning praise from Ramsay. Ariel missed parsnip purée instead of mashed potatoes, but spotted salmon instead of sea bass. Despite her vocal leadership, Ariel was let down by Kevin on scallops, who had forgotten his orders and thus blamed her. Elimination: Each chef nominated someone who they felt should not advance to the final service. Kevin and Ariel nominated each other and Dave nominated Ariel. Ramsay selected first Dave, and then Kevin to advance to the final, eliminating Ariel, who was allowed to keep her jacket as a token of her hard work and progression until that point. Ariel is the second contestant to have been allowed to keep their jacket after elimination, after Ji-Hyun Cha from season 5, who elected to withdraw from the competition due to injury. Ariel's comment: "I'm disappointed. I really, really wanted to win this. Learning from Chef Ramsay is such an amazing experience. I mean, he seems like he's just this crazy, mean guy when he's on the line. But all he wants to do is make you better. I feel that I did prove myself. I just want to blossom from here. And I know I will be successful. I know it in my heart. And I... I owe it all to Chef Ramsay."
78	15	"Winner Announced" "2 Chefs Compete"	October 13, 2009	HK-615	8.04
Challenge: Dave and Kevin were taken by limo to the Bonaventure Hotel as the site of the final individual challenge. Dave and Kevin had 45 minutes to cook a dish "worthy of the Araxi" to be judged by five-person panel of chefs and gourmands. Dave made a venison dish while Kevin made a petite clam bake with lobster. Dave won the first two points, though Kevin rebounded, winning the next two. Dave won the final point, and thus the challenge 3-2. Reward: Instead of prizes, Ramsay asked sous chef Scott for the "special deliveries" at the truck and opened the last six chefs eliminated from the competition, and Dave had the first pick. (Note: Andy and Tennille did not return because the former was still recovering from his finger injury and the latter was hospitalized due to back injury shortly after her elimination. Amanda and Robert took their places as they were the last two eliminated prior to the top eight.) Dave picked Ariel, Robert (who did return for the finale, unlike in the previous season where he withdrew due to health problems), and Suzanne; Kevin picked Van and Amanda, and was left with Sabrina. Dave was in charge of the blue kitchen with Scott as sous-chef, and Kevin had the red kitchen with Heather as sous-chef. Service: For the first time in Hell's Kitchen history, Dave and Kevin did not redesign their own dining rooms, but they still created their own menus. Dave kept his menu simple, while Kevin had elaborate but time-consuming dishes. Each kitchen served 50 diners, including each preparing a meal for Araxi executive chef James Walt. Kevin's team was stalled by Amanda's raw and overcooked scallops. After Amanda's pan caught fire, Kevin had her and Van switch stations, with Van helping redo a risotto that was returned for being undercooked. Amanda overcooked a beef tenderloin on entrees, prompting Kevin to show her how to cook it correctly. Dave started off well, though there was some conflict with Robert over how many mushrooms to put in risottos, and Ariel often overcooked venison, which eventually led to Robert going over and helping her. Eventually, the two teams were neck-and-neck by the time dinner service ended. However, both teams finished the service strongly. Winner: Ramsay determined the winner based on customer card's comments. He told Dave and Kevin to stand in front of two doors, with the winner's door opening. Dave's door opened, making him the sixth winner of Hell's Kitchen. Kevin took his defeat graciously. Kevin's comment: "There was a moment of defeat, and defeat tastes bad. But I took a deep breath, put my head back up, and the first thing I thought about is, I'm gonna show my kid it's okay. Never stop dreaming. Hold your head up high and know that you did your best." Dave's comment: "I can't believe I won. And it's a dream come true. I'm totally in a state of shock. I've been in so much pain for so many weeks, and I had to fight so hard to stay in the competition. But I wouldn't change any of it. This is the most important thing that's ever happened to me in my life, and I'm just so grateful to have earned Chef Ramsay's respect. That means more to me than anything else." Ramsay's comment: "Dave has a very natural ability and a very sophisticated palate. He fought through excruciating pain and excelled and went on to win Hell's Kitchen. He's gonna be an amazing asset to the Araxi Restaurant and Bar in Whistler, and I'd like to wish him the best of luck. Honestly, I don't think he'll need it."
