= Hell's Kitchen (American TV series) season 5 =

Hell's Kitchen
- Season 5
- Region 1 DVD cover
- Hosted by: Gordon Ramsay
- No. of contestants: 16
- Winner: Danny Veltri
- Runner-up: Paula DaSilva
- No. of episodes: 15

Release
- Original network: Fox
- Original release: January 29 – May 14, 2009

Season chronology
- ← Previous; Season 4 Next → Season 6

The fifth season of the American competitive reality television series Hell's Kitchen premiered on Fox on January 29, 2009, and concluded on May 14, 2009. Gordon Ramsay returned as host and head chef, while Scott Leibfried returned as the Blue Team's sous-chef and Gloria Felix returned and her last appearance as the Red Team's sous-chef. Jean-Philippe Susilovic returned as maître d'.

The season was won by executive chef Danny Veltri, with executive sous-chef Paula DaSilva finishing second.

== Contestants ==
Sixteen chefs competed in season five.

Contestant	Age (at time of filming)	Occupation	Hometown	Result
Danny Veltri	23 (Note: At age 23, Danny is to date the youngest winner of Hell's Kitchen, later tied with Trenton Garvey from Season 20.)	Executive Chef	Edgewater, Florida	Winner
Paula DaSilva	28	Executive Sous Chef	Coconut Creek, Florida	Runner-up
Andrea Heinly	30	Line Cook	Reading, Pennsylvania	Eliminated before finals
Ben Walanka (Note: Chef returned to Hell's Kitchen again on Season 17, finished at 16th place.)	26	Executive Sous Chef	Chicago, Illinois	Eliminated after twelfth service
Robert Hesse (Note: Chef returned to Hell's Kitchen again on Season 6, finished at 10th place.)	29	Sous Chef	Quogue, New York	Hospitalized after Atlantic City trip
Giovanni Filippone (Note: Chef returned to Hell's Kitchen again on Season 17, finished at 12th place.)	37	Executive Chef	Destin, Florida	Eliminated after tenth service
Carol Scott	30	Sous Chef	Knoxville, Tennessee	Eliminated after ninth service
Alicia "LA" Limtiaco	22	Line Cook	Las Vegas, Nevada	Eliminated after eighth service
Lacey D'Angelo	24	Corporate Buffet Cook	Charlotte, North Carolina	Ejected during eighth service
Jason "J" Maxwell	32	Food Court Chef	Clifton Park, New York	Ejected during seventh service
Coi Burruss	22	Cafe Chef	Austin, Texas	Eliminated after sixth service
Colleen Cleek	41	Culinary Instructor	Papillion, Nebraska	Eliminated after fifth service
Seth Levine	27	Private Party Chef	New York, New York	Eliminated after fourth service
Charlie McKay	25	Prep Chef	Las Vegas, Nevada	Eliminated after third service
Ji-Hyun Cha	33	Private Caterer	Palisades Park, New Jersey	Quit after second service
Sarah Kaye Phoenix (Note: Credited as Wil Kocol.)	27	Quality Control Chef	Elgin, Illinois	Eliminated after first service

== Contestant progress ==
Each week, the best member (as determined by Ramsay) from the losing team during the latest service period is asked to nominate two of their teammates for elimination; one of these two is meant to be sent home by Ramsay. On some weeks, there is a variation in the nomination process, depending on the losing team's (or even winning team's) performance.

No.	Chef	Original teams				1st switch		2nd switch			Individuals				Finals
No.	Chef	501	502	503	504	505	506	507	508	509	510	511	512	513	514/515
1	Danny	LOSE	WIN	LOSE	LOSE	LOSE	WIN	LOSE	WIN	BoW	IN	IN	IN	IN	WINNER
2	Paula	WIN	LOSE	WIN	LOSE	LOSE	LOSE	WIN	LOSE	WIN	BoW	NOM (Note: Paula's nomination was voided)	IN	IN	RUNNER-UP
3	Andrea	WIN	LOSE	WIN	LOSE	NOM	BoW	WIN	NOM	WIN	NOM	NOM	NOM	OUT	Paula's team
4	Ben	LOSE	WIN	LOSE	NOM	LOSE	WIN	NOM	WIN	NOM	IN	NOM	OUT		Danny's team
5	Robert	LOSE	WIN	LOSE	LOSE	LOSE	WIN	LOSE	WIN	NOM	IN	HOSP (Note: Robert was hospitalized and withdrew for health reasons)			
6	Giovanni	LOSE	WIN	LOSE	LOSE	BoW	WIN	WIN	LOSE	WIN	OUT				Danny's team
7	Carol	WIN	LOSE	WIN	LOSE	LOSE	LOSE	WIN	NOM	OUT					Danny's team
8	LA	WIN	LOSE	WIN	LOSE	BoW	NOM	WIN	OUT						Paula's team
9	Lacey	WIN	NOM	WIN	NOM	LOSE	WIN	NOM	EJEC						Paula's team
10	J	LOSE	WIN	LOSE	LOSE	NOM	WIN	EJEC							
11	Coi	WIN	LOSE	WIN	LOSE	LOSE	OUT								
12	Colleen	WIN	NOM	WIN	NOM	OUT									
13	Seth	NOM	WIN	NOM	OUT										
14	Charlie	LOSE	WIN	OUT											
15	Ji	WIN	LEFT (Note: Ji withdrew due to an injury)												
16	Wil	OUT													

Keywords

- WIN = Won the dinner service
- LOSE = Lost the dinner service
- BoB = Best of the Best, usually exempt from nomination
- BoW = Best of the Worst, sometimes exempt from nomination
- IN = not nominated for elimination
- NOM = nominated for elimination
- OUT = eliminated normally
- LEFT = withdrew from competition
- HOSP = eliminated due to hospitalization
- EJEC = eliminated during service

Color key
Chef was eliminated after regular nomination
Chef was eliminated after Ramsay's nomination
Chef was eliminated without nomination
Chef was eliminated from winning team
Chef was eliminated in the Cook For Your Life challenge
Chef was nominated to participate in the Cook For Your Life challenge
Chef was eliminated during service
Chef withdrew from the competition
Chef was the Best of the Best/Worst
Chef was retained after regular nomination
Chef was retained after Ramsay's nomination
Chef's nomination was voided
The winner of Hell's Kitchen
The runner-up of Hell's Kitchen

== Episodes ==
No. overall	No. in season	Title	Original release date	U.S. viewers (millions)
49	1	"16 Chefs Compete"	January 29, 2009	10.86
Three hundred chefs from across America were welcomed to Hell's Kitchen, but only sixteen were called down. Signature Dishes: Half of the chefs received positive to average reviews for their signature dish. Ramsay was impressed by Carol's roulade de veal, Ji's miso sake-marinated Chilean sea bass, and Ben's pan-seared Peking duck breast, deemed "by far the best dish on the men's team", and complimented Andrea, Coi, and Paula's dishes for being cooked and seasoned nicely. Wil's rabbit two ways and Robert's potato and white truffle-wrapped Chilean bass were delicious, but the former's dish was sloppily presented and the latter's was served with an "absolutely disgusting" sauce. The remaining dishes were poorly received; Ramsay called LA's fish and chips "terrible" and spat out Colleen's smoked chicken enchiladas and Lacey's chicken and blackberries. He also berated Colleen for telling him she taught manners, too, when he spat out her dish. He described Danny's grilled bananas as "hideous", deemed Charlie's dish "a joke" and compared it to a Ferris wheel, graded J's dish an "F", and criticized Giovanni for not being able to cook rice. Ramsay deemed Seth's cinnamon-crusted lamb with aubergine ratatouille, which was overly sweet due to the use of honey, "the worst dish" he had "ever tasted", causing Seth to laugh. In response, Ramsay threatened to eliminate him on the spot. After the challenge, Ramsay revealed that this season's winner would become the head chef of a brand-new restaurant at the Borgata in Atlantic City. Pre-Service: The teams were each told to give themselves a name. The men named themselves "Blues Brothers", while the women originally named themselves "Team Saffron", but changed it to "Spice Racks" after being called out by Ramsay. Charlie was instructed to shave prior to service, while the men became irritated with Seth's lack of basic prep skills and slow work. In the red kitchen, Lacey walked out of prep due to feeling overwhelmed and disrespected by the rest of her team, prepared the dessert station poorly, and got into an argument with Coi over it, requiring Ramsay to defuse the situation. Service: Carol and Giovanni were chosen as waiters. In the blue kitchen, Giovanni struggled as a waiter, forgetting orders on numerous occasions. Ben served raw spaghetti and Robert screamed over Ramsay when a ticket was being announced, but they managed to get the refire accepted and keep appetizers going out at a steady rate. Unfortunately, Danny overcooked scallops and then talked back to Ramsay after the latter scolded him, but Robert managed to calm him down and keep him focused. Seth served raw lamb, then attempted to re-sear it after slicing it, and Wil burnt gnocchi while falling behind on garnish, needing Robert, Ben, Charlie and Seth's help. A power outage happened during service, causing the kitchens to come to a halt, but Carol used this opportunity to give the customers alcohol. In the red kitchen, Lacey served raw scallops, and Colleen was scolded for patronizing the other chefs with needless instructions. She further angered Ramsay by unnecessarily putting mascarpone into an order of lobster spaghetti, cooking too much spaghetti at once and another order in a dirty pan, and accidentally putting sugar into a risotto instead of salt. After customers began walking out, Ramsay shut both kitchens down. The women won after Carol received an 88% above average customer rating, compared to 90% below average for Giovanni, whom Ramsay declared "the worst waiter in the history of Hell's Kitchen". Elimination: Seth and Wil were nominated. Though all the men were sick of Seth's ineptitude, immature behavior and lack of basic skills and wanted him gone, Ramsay eliminated Wil for nominating [herself], lacking Seth's passion, and poor performance on the garnish station. Wil's comment: "I took a risk nominating myself. I fucked up tonight, plain and simple. Striking out first time up to bat is very, very demoralizing. I feel very humbled right now." Ramsay's comment: "I found it quite strange that Wil didn't even have the will to succeed. He clearly didn't belong in Hell's Kitchen."
50	2	"15 Chefs Compete"	February 5, 2009	7.71
Team challenge: The contestants were awakened early in the morning by a marching band, and were greeted outside by Ramsay and two piles of garbage bags containing the discarded food from last night's service. Instead of sorting through the trash, Ramsay ordered the contestants to fish scallops out of two large crates, carry them to the kitchen, and shuck as many scallops as they could in fifteen minutes. Ramsay chose Andrea to sit out in order to even out both teams. The women went first. Carol scored eight, Paula scored only one, Coi scored six and Colleen scored five. The women totaled 35 after LA, Ji, and Lacey scored eight, four and three respectively, the latter of which caused Lacey to become agitated. For the men, Ben scored only three, Danny scored nine and Giovanni scored an impressive 13 of his 15 scallops. Robert scored five, Charlie scored only two and Seth scored three, tying the score at 35. J was the last person to go up. His first five scallops were rejected but his sixth - and last - passed, eking out a victory for the men. Reward/punishment: The men flew in a helicopter to Catalina Island, but Robert was forced to take a ferry due to his weight. While on a submarine ride, Seth demonstrated a level of knowledge of Gordon's personal life to the point that the guys jokingly believed that Seth was stalking him. When Robert finally arrived, with the long trip causing him to miss out on the day's events, it was time for the group to head back. Meanwhile, the women spent the day prepping a raw bar for the night's service. Lacey retreated to her bunk in tears after being called out by Ramsay for her substandard performance (despite not performing the worst for the women). Ji attempted to talk Lacey out of her funk, but to no avail. After arguing with Carol over her attitude, Lacey claimed illness and remained in bed, not showing up in the kitchen until six hours into the punishment. Service: Only thirty minutes before the start of service, Ji suffered an ankle injury after slipping on some oil that left her participation in doubt, but after receiving treatment she announced to Ramsay that she would be taking part in the service. Robert and Paula were assigned as raw bar servers; Robert's amiability impressed Jean-Philippe and the customers. Charlie undercooked and under seasoned a risotto, admitting to Ramsay that he had never cooked one before. Ben bailed Charlie out with his replacement, only for Charlie and Seth to serve a spaghetti with no lobster. Ramsay got angry at Giovanni for undercooking salmon, but thanks to Danny on meat, the men kept serving entrées at a steady rate. In the red kitchen, Carol got overwhelmed on appetizers and produced a risotto that stuck to the pan, but, thanks to Andrea taking control of the station, the red team managed to produce acceptable appetizers. Unfortunately, Colleen burned three orders of scallops and needed Lacey's help. Colleen later served a salmon burnt on the outside and raw on the inside, while also forgetting a John Dory on the same ticket. This led Ramsay to furiously question her credentials as a culinary instructor. When she burned yet two more orders of salmon, Ramsay demoted her to the raw bar and replaced her on the fish station with Lacey, while bringing in Paula to help Coi on meat, after which things picked up. Ji's injury hobbled her throughout service, though she still performed well. To make things interesting near the end, Ramsay gathered both teams and declared that whoever completed service first was the winner. Both sides were neck-and-neck until Carol stalled the women on a dish that everyone else was ready for, allowing the men to emerge victorious. Elimination: Colleen and Lacey were nominated. In a deleted scene included on the DVD release, the others attempted to persuade Carol to nominate herself in place of Colleen, hoping to ensure Lacey's elimination despite regarding Colleen as their worst cook, but Carol feared being eliminated for costing her team the win. After Colleen and Lacey made their pleas, Ji, whose injury confined her to a wheelchair, announced to Ramsay that she wished to withdraw from the competition. Ramsay honored Ji's request and allowed her to leave, thus reluctantly sparing Colleen and Lacey from elimination. He then lauded Ji personally for her effort and her "phenomenal" performance, while allowing her to keep her jacket as a token of her bravery (this was the first time Ramsay had let a contestant keep their jacket; it became much more common in later seasons). After she bid a tearful goodbye to her teammates, she was wheeled by Andrea out of Hell's Kitchen, with the men giving her a farewell standing ovation for her gritty performance. Despite withdrawing from the competition due to injury, she got her picture burned, unlike Vanessa Gunnell from season 4. Ji's comment: "I know I could've gone all the way. It sucks to leave, you know, because of an injury. I'd rather be leaving because of lack of skill or something, you know? Maybe it was just not meant to be." Ramsay's comment: "Ji showed great courage. Unfortunately, her injury got in the way of her dream. She had a chance to win this, but sadly we will never, ever know."
51	3	"14 Chefs Compete"	February 19, 2009	6.57
Team challenge: Both teams were awakened at six the next morning by the ringing of cowbells from sous chefs Scott and Gloria, and were taken on a field trip to a meat processing plant, where Scott showed the contestants how the meat was butchered and what parts of the cattle produced specific cuts. Back in the kitchen, the team challenge was to correctly label several cuts of meat, then attach the signs identifying the cuts to the proper locations on color-coded cow statues. J and Colleen got their teams off to good starts with five correct cuts out of eight on their respective statues, but then Seth and Lacey caused major setbacks for their sides, effectively forcing both teams to start over. Ben eventually labeled all of the cuts correctly, giving the men their second consecutive challenge victory. Paula had the distinction of successfully completing both parts of the challenge for the women, but had been beaten to the task by the men both times. Reward/punishment: The men flew to Sunstone Winery in Santa Ynez, California, where they enjoyed a wine tasting followed by a steak dinner. The women stayed behind to butcher two large sides of beef after hauling both into the kitchen. In addition, Scott presented them their lunch consisting entirely of offal, leading Lacey to vomit and cause a chain reaction of LA and Andrea upchucking while the others plugged their ears. Andrea, clearly traumatized by the repulsive meal and her having vomited multiple times as a result, desperately made the women promise to bond together and try harder to avoid future punishments. Service: Hell's Kitchen opened for its first-ever "steakhouse" service, split into two two-hour shifts with one team cooking and the other serving. Robert was determined to have a good service, as it had coincided with what was to be his wedding day. During the first shift, Ben, misinterpreting a command from Ramsay, prepared six orders of dessert before any appetizers had been served, while Charlie struggled to keep up on the fish station and was oblivious to his cooking cloth catching fire, which Scott had to put out. Giovanni, despite being an executive chef at a steak house, had multiple steaks returned for being undercooked and overcooked, and eventually ran out of filets. When asked to cut more, Seth over butchered a tenderloin, wasting a great deal of meat in the process, and tried unsuccessfully to hide the scraps from Ramsay. The red team was slow to get orders to the kitchen, especially Lacey, who had to return some appetizers due to not telling the diners what was on them and forgot to take entree orders from some of her tables. Ramsay ended the first shift after Giovanni revealed he was four minutes away on a New York strip, as their time limit was up. During the second shift, Colleen lost track of the appetizers and Coi served raw shrimp, but entrees ran smoothly as Andrea had all her steaks approved by Ramsay. Ben, Seth, and Giovanni nonetheless returned some of the steaks to the kitchen, but Ramsay confirmed that they were all cooked correctly to order and accused the men of deliberately writing incorrect tickets in an attempt to sabotage the women, which Seth admitted to in a confessional. Charlie forgot which tables he had taken orders from and then dropped food onto one table. The women fell just three tables short of completing service within the time limit, due to Carol mistakenly cooking two New York strip instead of two filet mignon, but were named the winners for completing more tables; Charlie and Lacey were named the worst servers on customer comment cards. Elimination: Seth and Charlie were nominated. Despite Seth's horrendous butchering of the filet, falsely accusing J of lying about the nominees, and annoying Ramsay and his teammates with an excessively long plea, Charlie was eliminated for his lack of progress over three services and being the weakest performer of the night. Charlie's comment: "This is the first job I've ever been fired from. Chef Ramsay made the wrong decision. I did what I could and I worked my ass off for the guy. I'm confident in my ability, and if he didn't see that, that's his own bad." Ramsay's comment: "Charlie is a prep chef, but I'm looking for a head chef. He seemed like a nice guy, but you know where nice guys finish."
52	4	"13 Chefs Compete"	February 26, 2009	9.9
Team challenge: Both teams cooked a special breakfast service for a group of 100 young football players and cheerleaders. Colleen became distracted by the cheerleaders, forcing Ramsay to order her back on her station, while Coi burned several pancakes. The men had an early lead but squandered it after Seth stumbled on scrambled eggs that he claimed were inspired by one of Ramsay's recipes. This gave the women their first challenge victory of the season. Ben and Danny later got into a heated argument in the dorms after Danny had boasted that he was the strongest cook on the men's team. Reward/punishment: The women went on a pool day at the Beverly Wilshire Hotel. The guys faced the arduous task of cleaning up both the dining room and kitchens in addition to prepping both sides for tonight's service. However, they failed to finish the red kitchen's prep by the time the women returned, due to Danny and Robert plotting to get Ben out. Service: The women were missing their tomato butter sauce, which was supposed to have been made during the men's prep; Ramsay suspected sabotage, especially when the sauce that Ben gave them was far too salty, leading to Danny properly preparing a new batch. Giovanni lagged on boiling the water for spaghetti, and J left the butt from a head of lettuce in a Caesar salad, infuriating Ramsay. Ben cut the lamb chops too thinly, and Ramsay threatened to throw Danny out for not responding when asked for a time on chicken garnish. Seth proved to be the worst performer of the night as he overcooked scallops, didn't pay attention when Ramsay called out a ticket, then was caught wiping a pan with a soiled cloth that he had just previously used to wipe his face. In the red kitchen, Coi cooked pasta ahead of order, undercooked two lobster spaghetti that were also short on lobster, then dropped one of the pans containing the replacements. LA and Colleen conflicted on the meat station, sending up poorly trimmed wellingtons and later one wellington too many. Ramsay finally had enough and named both teams joint-losers, before sending them upstairs to come up with two nominees for elimination. Elimination: Before asking for the nominees, Ramsay showed J the butt of lettuce, expecting him to be nominated, although Danny revealed Seth and Ben as the nominees. When Lacey revealed the nominees as Colleen and herself, Ramsay was shocked that Coi wasn't nominated (she had actually attempted to nominate herself, but Carol persuaded the other women to nominate Lacey instead) but took Lacey anyway, as Coi had openly admitted her mistakes. Ramsay eliminated Seth for being a consistently terrible performer, much to the relief of the men. Seth's comment: "My abilities and my skills definitely was what lagged behind. Not my confidence, not my passion, not my love for food. You know what, Chef Ramsay decided it was my turn to go home, and I hope he welcomes the competition in New York when I open my restaurant." Team change: Lacey was transferred over to the men's team to even out the numbers after most of the women made it clear they were not willing to continue working with her. Ramsay's comment: "Seth showed that he had all the passion in the world, but the bottom line is he's a crap cook."
53	5	"12 Chefs Compete"	March 5, 2009	9.71
Team challenge: Both teams visited an Asian supermarket, where they purchased the ingredients needed for Asian-fusion dishes with limits of only 25 minutes to shop and $100. The mandatory ingredients consisted of one type of seafood, poultry, and meat, and both teams had an hour to prepare the dishes. Each dish was judged by Chef Ramsay and Epicurious editor-in-chief Tanya Steel. The blue team scored on poultry, while the red team scored on seafood. The red team's beef dish was overwhelmed by spice while the blue team's was undercooked. In a tough decision, Tanya gave the challenge deciding point to the red team. Reward/punishment: The red team's winning dishes were featured on the Epicurious website. The women also spent the day sumo wrestling in oversized sumo suits, which included Ramsay taking down Jean-Philippe to everyone's amusement, and later imbibing on sake. The blue team made fortune cookies and folded origami for tonight's service. Lacey, having drawn the ire of her new teammates from the outset, got back in their good graces with her work on the origami. Service: In addition to the regular customers, the night's patrons included a group of sumo wrestlers, both of whom ordered one of everything on the menu; Ramsay split it down the middle between the kitchens. The teams enjoyed a strong start on appetizers fueled by Giovanni and LA's risottos, while Lacey surprisingly emerged as a leader on the blue team with a strong performance on garnish, but the meat station was a wreck on both sides: J undercooked Wellingtons and chicken and then forgot an order of lamb on a later ticket, while Ramsay discovered a stash of burnt wellingtons hidden underneath Andrea's station; Andrea then became overwhelmed and gave inconsistent timings to Carol on fish. In addition, Colleen was also scolded for leaving the oven door open when there were Wellingtons in there. Robert wasted a lot of food while preparing his dishes, due to not wanting to take anything up if he didn't feel it was adequate, and angered Ramsay further by not responding when Ramsay repeatedly addressed him as "Bobby." When Colleen's tart was returned with both the pear and the pastry raw, Ramsay closed the kitchens and called it the worst performance so far. In a private meeting after the service, Robert explained that he did not respond to "Bobby" because that was the name of his abusive father and that it brought back painful memories from his childhood. Ramsay apologized and replied that he would respect Robert's wishes, adding that it would not have happened had he known about it beforehand. Giovanni and LA were selected as the best of the worst for their teams and were tasked with choosing one person for elimination, though Lacey was also singled out for praise for her leadership and strong performance. Elimination: Giovanni nominated J while LA chose Andrea. Ramsay appeared to want Robert nominated, but Giovanni reasoned that Robert recovered from his mistakes that night better than J. Ramsay accepted the nominees but ultimately spared them, instead eliminating Colleen for not yet having a good service but praising her tenacity and fight, and told the remaining contestants to follow that example. Colleen's comment: "Chef Ramsay and Hell's Kitchen made me better. It made me a better person, it's gonna make me a better mom, it's gonna make me a better chef, and it's gonna make me a better instructor. And I hope that one day he'll cook at my cooking school." Ramsay's comment: "There was no place in the kitchen I could put Colleen where she wasn't a disaster. It's time for her to go back to where she belongs: teaching, because she certainly can't cook."
54	6	"11 Chefs Compete"	March 12, 2009	7.71
Team challenge: Hell's Kitchen would be hosting a bar mitzvah for the first time, much to the excitement of Ben, who was of Jewish heritage. For the team challenge, the chefs had to create gourmet versions of chicken soup, brisket, and burgers, the favorite foods of Max Reuben, the young guest of honor. Giovanni beat Andrea on soup, while LA beat Ben on brisket. Max liked both Robert's and Carol's burgers, but chose Robert's only because he didn't like blue cheese (which the team had warned Carol about earlier), giving a 2-1 win to the blue team. Reward/punishment: The blue team were treated to a day at Skin Haven spa while the red team had to set up the dining room complete with a basketball court and dance floor while the flamboyant emcee Francisco was brought back for a third go-round in Hell's Kitchen, much to Jean-Philippe's annoyance and disdain. Carol and Andrea sniped at each other throughout the punishment. Service: Andrea didn't put enough mushrooms in her risotto, but soon got back on track. The women were then summoned to the dining room for the second part of their punishment, which was carrying Max on a chair during the Hora dance, before returning to the kitchen. Max's entrees were to be served first on Ramsay's orders, but Coi struggled on burgers; she first brought them up cold due to LA's suggestion and then got overwhelmed when the rest of her team swarmed her station before bringing up an acceptable portion. However, she then served underportioned brisket and LA's help proved largely ineffectual. In the blue kitchen, Lacey had trouble heating up the briskets and conflicted with her team, J forgot to present a salad with no dressing, and Ramsay criticized Danny for serving food on dirty plates, while Danny argued that the plates were getting dirty as they were being garnished along the line. In the dining room, Francisco was carrying a cake for Max but dropped it when he bumped into Jean-Philippe, greatly angering the latter. At the end, both teams completed service and Ramsay presented Max with a special surprise: the Harlem Globetrotters. During cleanup, Carol said that she had wanted to punch Andrea in the throat, then insisted she made the remark in jest when called out by Andrea during deliberation on the patio. The blue team won for their level of consistency during service. Elimination: Andrea was chosen as Best of the Worst, much to the disgust and confusion of her team. After much struggle, she quickly nominated LA and Coi when pressured by Ramsay. As according to plan, they, along with Carol, declared Andrea as the worst. Paula voted for Coi, leading Ramsay to eliminate Coi for her mistakes on the meat station, though he praised her for her attitude. Coi's comment: "I feel Andrea should be here right now. I'm angry for the fact she wasn't seen as the worst. I don't feel like I should be going home." Ramsay's comment: "When this competition began, I thought Coi was gonna be a really strong chef. But tonight she was exposed when she couldn't even cook a bloody burger."
55	7	"10 Chefs Compete"	March 19, 2009	7.54
Team change: Before the start of the challenge, Ramsay transferred Giovanni to the red team, which was two members short after Lacey had been transferred to the blue team. Team challenge: After tasting six different salmon tapas from one of Ramsay's restaurants, the chefs had 20 minutes to make their own with leftovers from the previous service, with the teams going head-to-head. Paula's and Danny's red meat dishes both scored, but neither Lacey's nor LA's did. Robert beat Carol when she mistook balsamic vinaigrette for soy sauce, but Andrea's ravioli dish beat J's lobster broth, which Ramsay deemed overly simple. Giovanni's surf and turf won the challenge for the red team, after which he urged his new teammates to put their differences aside and work together in the name of having a successful service. Reward/punishment: The red team visited Hollywood Park for a day of watching horse racing with Ramsay. The blue team prepped both kitchens for that night's service, then unloaded and cleaned small tapas plates. During prep, Lacey continually complained about the amount of work and argued with her team, walking out of the kitchen and threatening to quit the competition before Ben talked her back inside. Service: Carol served overcooked risotto, then revealed that J overcooked both teams' rice during the prep, rendering it inedible and forcing Ramsay to take the risotto off the menu for the night. J then repeatedly sent raw and burnt salmon entrees to the pass. When he eventually did manage an acceptable serving, he forgot to bring the sauce up to the pass, forcing Ramsay to issue him a stern warning behind closed doors, only to be eliminated on the spot after overcooking scallops. Ben fell behind on wellingtons and served them cold while being slow to bring up the sauce, then was threatened with elimination, even with J already gone, for nearly cooking the refire on a dirty tray. Andrea and Carol were forced to eat an undercooked pasta appetizer that had been sent back while blaming each other, while LA became unresponsive, cooked too many John Dory at once, and didn't bring enough sauce, all while taking offense to Ramsay calling her a "silly cow." Nevertheless, both teams completed service, with the red team finishing well in advance thanks to Giovanni's leadership and Paula's strong performance on meat, in particular earning high praise from Ramsay for a Wellington that he deemed the best-ever prepared in Hell's Kitchen. Carol and Andrea continued their feud right after the service, with Paula and Giovanni quickly tiring of the bickering. Automatic elimination: After J overcooked the entire supply of rice for both teams during prep, struggled with salmon, and overcooked scallops, Ramsay lost his patience and eliminated him on the spot, making him the second contestant to be eliminated during dinner service after Josh from season 3. At the end of the episode, J still got the usual coat-hanging and picture-burning sequence. J's comment: "I guess I don't belong here, so I'll be going home. I'm here for a reason and it's my boy and my wife. So, of course, I'm disappointed. It was a tough day. My dream, when I came to Hell's Kitchen, was to win. So now it's time to move on and get my own restaurants going. You know, I don't need Chef Ramsay's opinion anymore. I've got it. But it's time for J Maxwell to do his own thing." Elimination: Ramsay asked the blue team the one person they do not want on their team any longer. The men picked Lacey, who picked Robert due to a heated exchange on the patio where Robert sarcastically stated that if she actually managed to win he would become a crack whore. Despite the men losing respect for Lacey for nearly quitting and walking out of prep again, Ramsay called down Ben for not nominating himself. Ben admitted that he had been the weakest performer of the night (besides the already-eliminated J); Ramsay ultimately spared him and Lacey, since J's blunders had buried the blue kitchen from the outset of service. Ramsay's comment: "I kept Ben and Lacey because J put the kitchen in such a hole that they never stood a chance. They're very lucky that I sent J packing."
56	8	"9 Chefs Compete"	March 26, 2009	10.13
Team challenge: After tricking the chefs with beef and scallop tartares that were actually made with tuna and sea bass, Ramsay issued a blind taste test challenge. LA surprised Ramsay and her teammates by promptly volunteering to sit out in order to even the sides. Ben topped Andrea 3-2, neither Robert nor Giovanni scored, then the red team rebounded with Carol topping Lacey 3-1. Paula and Danny, again going head-to-head in a challenge, were tasked to identify ingredients in Ramsay's minestrone soup recipe. Danny quickly got the first three ingredients, though Paula rebounded to identify the last three to earn the red team an 8-7 victory. Reward/punishment: The red team was treated to a TV Guide photoshoot inside the restaurant while the blue team had to prep both kitchens for the night's service in addition to preparing lunch and hors d'oeuvres for the red team. During the shoot, Ben accidentally spilled champagne after a flashbulb had startled him, much to the red team’s amusement. Service: Actors in attendance included Eric McCormack sitting at the blue dining room and Robert Patrick at the red dining room. Paula made a rare mistake by bringing a salty risotto to the pass, but redeemed herself with the replacement. Robert cooked too much spaghetti but got appetizers with Ben's help. However, the blue team was affected by a hapless Lacey panicking on meat, not knowing when the proteins would be ready. After Lacey's pan caught fire, Ramsay pulled her aside to get her head back in the game. When Lacey produced overly thin lamb chops for McCormack's table, Ramsay immediately eliminated her just one week after having eliminated J mid-service. Despite being a member short for the second consecutive service, the blue team rallied and completed service with only three chefs. The red team, on the other hand, struggled throughout due to Carol's indecisiveness and lack of communication on the meat station, which caused Andrea to overcook her John Dory and LA to have to repeatedly recook her garnish. Carol also had lamb returned from the dining room for being undercooked, and LA served cold and lumpy potatoes, with Ramsay describing her as "half-awake". With the blue team having finished their service and the red team nowhere near completing theirs, due to Carol falling behind on wellington and chicken, Ramsay shut the red kitchen down and asked for two nominees while praising the blue team's teamwork. Automatic elimination: Lacey's problems on the meat station continued as she continually complained that she couldn't cook meat. Ramsay took her into the storage room and sternly warned her she was on her final straw. When she finally brought lamb up, it was sliced too thin, so Ramsay eliminated her on the spot, to which she agreed. That makes Lacey the third contestant to be eliminated during dinner service after Josh from season 3 and J from the night before. It also marks the first and only season thus far that Ramsay did a mid-service elimination in two dinner services. Lacey was then told to say her farewells, though her team was largely unresponsive, feeling relieved she had left. Lacey's comment: "On one hand, it's a relief. I can get back to my normal life. But, you know, another part of me wishes to stay and learn more and have that chance to win, but unfortunately, I fucked up tonight and I can only look back on the positive things, which there weren't many for me. You know, my mom told me when I came here, 'Don't make enemies,' and that's the first thing I did and kept doing the whole time I was here. Sorry, Mom, I should've listened." Ramsay's comment (Lacey): "Spacy Lacey, Gone!" Elimination: The women unanimously agreed to nominate Carol, but they conflicted on the second nominee. LA and Carol picked Andrea, but the others decided on LA, so Ramsay ordered LA, Carol and Andrea to step forward. Ramsay eliminated LA for not truly excelling in any service or showing any leadership qualities. Ramsay didn't comment on Lacey's departure except in the post-mortem, but at the start of episode 14, hers and LA's pictures were both burned and their jackets hooked simultaneously. LA's comment: "I definitely think Chef Ramsay made the wrong decision. Anything I did in there, I did it to the best of my ability. I'm big on not showing emotions in the kitchen. Emotions are weakness and I will never be weak, never." Ramsay's comment (LA): "LA was a real workhorse in the kitchen. I kicked her out of Hell's Kitchen because she lacked two crucial skills to be a great chef – leadership and creativity."
57	9	"7 Chefs Compete"	April 2, 2009	6.95
Team challenge: The teams created individual dishes, featuring the main ingredient, red king crab; one dish from each team would be presented as a specialty crab dish to Chef Ramsay. The blue team chose Ben's dish (much to Danny's disdain) while the red team was conflicted between Andrea's and Paula's, eventually choosing the former's. Ramsay was not impressed by either Andrea's or Ben's dishes and asked for Paula's and Danny's dishes instead. Both their dishes were much better received than Ben and Andrea's dishes and as a result, the blue team won in a very close finish. Reward/punishment: The blue team headed to Santa Monica State Beach for a day of fun at the beach with Ramsay where they rode Segways before enjoying a lobster lunch at a seafood restaurant. Robert again suffered because of his weight, being forced to ride a bike. The red team cleaned both of the team's dorms and cooked all of the red king crabs. Service: For this service, the teams were asked to come up with their own menus for the night. Ben insisted on pomme fondant, which Danny and Robert had no idea of or interest in, though they agreed with it anyway, while Carol insisted on gratin dauphinoise potatoes, which she claimed never went wrong. Service was extremely bad for both teams; Carol completely sunk the kitchen by not knowing her potatoes had to be cooked before service, which led to the entire kitchen being backed up as she fruitlessly tried to get the potatoes cooked. After Ramsay found her adding cream in an attempt to cook them, he threw out the entire batch and made the team switch to using sauteed potatoes. Giovanni had his carpaccio dish returned for being under seasoned, only for the same guest attempt to take her second unseasoned carpaccio dish up to the pass and whistle to get Ramsay's attention, who insulted her back to her seat. Carol continued to struggle on the meat station by undercooking steaks. In the blue kitchen, Ben served overly salty soup and argued with Ramsay over the right method to cook pomme fondant. Robert served three steaks of different sizes and forgot to cook an order of halibut for a table, leading Ben to believe that Robert couldn't keep up with the speed of the kitchen. After Carol had another steak returned for being undercooked, Ramsay ordered both kitchens to shut down. Although the red vs blue menu ended in a disaster, Ramsay decided on the winner based on customer reviews. The red team won even with a mediocre 54% customer satisfaction rating, which was still much better than the blue team's 39%. Elimination: Danny was named best of the worst as he did not make any mistakes that night. He nominated Ben, but Ramsay also nominated Robert. However, Ramsay eliminated Carol for giving up during service and sabotaging her team by putting the potato dish on the menu and undercooking it numerous times. Carol was the first chef to be eliminated from a team that won dinner service. Carol's comment: "I came here with the attitude that I'm going to win this competition, I'm gonna be this famous chef that everybody wants to work for. It's very humbling to be standing here a loser." Ramsay's comment: "Carol knew she was out of her depth in Hell's Kitchen. I just put her out of her misery."
58	10	"6 Chefs Compete"	April 9, 2009	7.54
Ramsay told Danny and Paula to choose who they thought was the weakest on their team and they chose Andrea and Ben. Andrea and Ben were called and told to remove their jackets, thinking they were facing elimination, when in fact they were told that everyone would be competing as a single team. Team challenge: In the first individual challenge, each chef cooked a dish using 14 specific ingredients, including chicken, pasta, and wine. While Ramsay considered all of the dishes to be delicious, he singled out Ben and Danny's dishes, with Ben's being the best. Ben then was told to pick a friend to enjoy the reward; he chose Robert, irking Danny, who had had the second best dish. Reward/punishment: Ben took a trip with Ramsay and Robert to San Francisco where they dined at the exclusive chef's table at the One Market restaurant. The others spent the day taking deliveries. Giovanni ended up being fed up with the punishment, after breaking boxes of bottled water, and having to chase a seafood truck for being short two lobster, later to find out that the order was correct after all. He also got into an argument with Paula, who was trying to calm him down. Service: Dinner service was a complete disaster. Paula was strong on appetizers, but Robert overcooked scallops and cooked John Dory and bacon in the same pan. Giovanni was scolded for repeatedly opening and closing the oven and undercooking Ben's dish. He also struggled to communicate properly with Andrea and Robert on garnish and fish respectively, and talked back to Ramsay over being called "dickface" after improperly cooking Ben's dish again, leading to a heated confrontation between the two. Later, Giovanni placed a hot pan in the refrigerator to cool it down, only to burn Robert's hand when picking it up and walking along the line without letting anyone know. Robert left service for a great deal of time, suffering from a second-degree burn. Andrea cooked potatoes ahead of time in a cold pan and threw them away instead of saving them, then was thrown out for failing multiple times to repeat an order. She nearly walked out of the competition, but Jean-Philippe encouraged her to stay and fight back, and Ramsay allowed her to return to the kitchen. Ramsay put Ben on the meat station with Giovanni, but Ben put a sliced chicken back in the oven after realizing it was undercooked, causing it to dry out. After Andrea's pan caught on fire, service ended prematurely with Ramsay walking out of the kitchen in disgust. Elimination: Paula was named Best of the Worst, and nominated Giovanni and Andrea. Despite Andrea being the worst performer of the night, Ramsay eliminated Giovanni for the verbal confrontation during service and for burning Robert's hand. Giovanni's coat hanging and picture burning sequence was featured in the recap at the beginning of episode 14. Giovanni's comment: "I wanted a challenge, and that's what I got. I got a challenge out of it. I learned some great things, I did some great things I've never imagined doing. I worked in a kitchen with a bunch of great people. I'll take some things from everybody here. I've learned from every single one of them. So I'll take that and move on. And, yeah, of course I wanted to win. I'm not gonna lie and say, 'Hey, well, it was just a challenge.' I wanted to win it, but not that I could do better than what I did. I tried doing my best, it wasn't good enough. Simple as that." Shutdown: At 2:14 AM, Ramsay called the remaining chefs to the kitchen, announcing that due to that night's service and his dissatisfaction with the final five, Hell's Kitchen was shutting down.
59	11	"5 Chefs Compete"	April 16, 2009	8.11
Continued from the previous episode, Ramsay told the final five that he did not permanently shut down Hell's Kitchen. Instead, the contestants were flown to the Borgata Hotel and Casino for a multi-day trip to see their potential future place of employment. After touring the hotel, they sat down for dinner with the Borgata Hotel's vice president of cuisine. Robert left the table after a few minutes, complaining of chest pains; he was taken to the hospital for observation and tests. Withdrawal: After a few days of waiting, Robert returned to Hell's Kitchen. He reported that he had pericarditis and announced his departure from Hell's Kitchen because of his condition. Robert was asked to say his goodbyes to the final four, who were emotional at his departure, before Ramsay remarked that Robert had a real possibility to win. Unlike Ji in the second episode, Robert had to give back his jacket to Ramsay but did get his picture burned at the end of the episode. (Note: Robert would return as a contestant in the following season. He finished in 10th place, but unlike this season, he participated with his team in the final service.) Robert's comment: "I knew I was coming in as the underdog. I knew I had to fight and just grab my way to the top. I have no regrets. I'm proud of every day that I've been here. I'm proud that I got to associate myself with one of the best chefs in the world. I'm leaving Hell's Kitchen so I have my health for my family, for my career. I feel like I've won." Challenge: After visiting Borgata, each of the final four presented the signature dish that they would serve in their restaurant, should they win Hell's Kitchen. Danny's dish was praised for flavor but criticized for appearance. Andrea's tuna dish was praised overall as was Paula's, despite fears of overcooking. Ben's dish, meanwhile, was praised for presentation, but received the worst review for leaving the tails on the prawns. Ramsay ultimately proclaimed Andrea the winner. Reward/punishment: Andrea received one-time immunity from the next elimination. Additionally, unless there was a specific best of the best or best of the worst after the next service, she would get to decide on the nominees for elimination. No punishment was given. Ben, Danny, and Paula, however, were upset that Andrea, who presented a dish with virtually no cooking and who they constantly believe was outperformed, would last longer than one of them. Service: Before service, Ramsay reminded Andrea of her immunity, instructing her to use it to perform well. Despite this, Andrea continually struggled on the fish station, undercooking and overcooking scallops and refusing to cook on full heat. Ben struggled on garnish, forgetting several orders before sending up cold carrot puree. He was temporarily sent out for having a messy work station, but bounced back. Paula put in a very strong performance on the meat station, only being criticized for not sending up wellingtons when Andrea needed four minutes on salmon. When Andrea had a raw salmon sent back and also undercooked John Dory, Danny was asked to jump in to help her, much to his chagrin. Ramsay asked the team to come up with two nominees between Ben, Danny, and Paula. Elimination: The team nominated Ben and Paula, while acknowledging that Andrea would be nominated if she was not safe. However, after hearing from Paula briefly, Ramsay immediately sent her back in line and called Andrea to step forward. Ramsay decided not to eliminate anybody thanks to Andrea's immunity. He noted that had Andrea not won the challenge and earned immunity, she would have been eliminated. Robert's photo was burned at the end of the episode, although his jacket was not placed on the hook.
60	12	"4 Chefs Compete"	April 23, 2009	6.80
Challenge: The chefs had to recreate Ramsay's Italian fish stew based on taste alone. Andrea came in last for mistaking halibut for red snapper and bay scallops for sea scallops, while Ben was third for adding too much saffron. Danny was declared the winner over Paula for correctly using fish stock rather than water. Reward/punishment: Danny went along with Ramsay to go fly in separate biplanes. Paula, Ben, and Andrea polished all the crystal and shampooed all the carpets in addition to preparing for that night's service. Service: To motivate the chefs before service, Ramsay gave each chef a set of his brand of stainless steel cookware in the dorms. Service was smooth for the most part, but Ben cooked spaghetti in water that wasn't boiling and put croutons in a "plain" salad meant for a vegetarian diner. Danny was slow to communicate on garnish but recovered, while Andrea burned wellingtons. One customer informed Jean-Philippe that he wanted to propose to his girlfriend. He gave the ring to Jean-Philippe, who then gave the ring to Ramsay. The wedding ring was placed on a dessert with the words "Will you marry me?" written on the plate and delivered to the couple. The girl accepted the proposal as the restaurant broke out in applause and Ramsay presented the girl with a rose and congratulated the new couple personally. Service ran smoothly right until the end when Andrea found herself short on two wellingtons. This required Danny and Paula to retrieve the wellingtons from the store room and prepare them from scratch, taking an additional 15 minutes. This left Ramsay extremely disappointed at the final part of service, as it had been their strongest so far. He told the chefs to come up with one nominee for elimination. Elimination: The chefs were split between Andrea and Ben, so Ramsay called them both down. Ramsay eliminated Ben for his downward spiral. Before he left, Ramsay gave him some encouraging words and told him that his energy, attitude and hard work in Hell's Kitchen was outstanding, and also told him to keep all of those good qualities. Ramsay didn't comment on Ben's departure but Ben got his full elimination sequence during the recap episode. Ben's comment: "Being eliminated from Hell's Kitchen, I don't walk away sour, I don't walk away upset. I walk away with what an incredible experience this whole thing has been. Private planes and helicopters and dinner with Chef in San Francisco, I've definitely tasted the sweetness of this competition. You know, sad to go. You know, upset that I had to leave like this and certainly upset that I left at the time that I did. But I'll live to fight another day."
61	13	"3 Chefs Compete"	April 30, 2009	6.84
Previously, Ramsay announced that he would give a surprise to the remaining three contestants. This surprise was a visit from Paula's mother and sister, Andrea's cousin and mother and Danny's girlfriend and father. Challenge: Each chef had 90 minutes to create dishes for each of the 100 diners—all of them Los Angeles' best chefs. Each of the diners would also determine which dish was the best and which was the worst. 76% of the chefs polled determined Danny's blackened halibut to be the worst, while 76% thought Paula's poached sturgeon dish was the best. Andrea was surprised at how beaten down Danny felt after the challenge. Reward/punishment: Paula got a special makeover. The following morning, she and Ramsay appeared live on KTTV's Good Day L.A.. Andrea and Danny stay behind to thoroughly clean the dining area and do the laundry, as well as watch the Good Day L.A. segment, in which they were surprised by Paula's appearance. Service: For this service, as with previous seasons, each chef would take turns at the pass, while Scott and Gloria purposely added errors to the dishes for them to spot. Paula struggled initially, fumbling an order before plating a dish with squash puree instead of carrot puree, though she rebounded and spotted spinach soup instead of watercress soup. Danny had a particularly poor start in his performance at the pass; his voice broke when calling an order and he struggled to spot raw potatoes from Gloria. Andrea was rather strong during her time at the pass, including spotting various deficiencies and errors left. After she missed Scott sending up halibut instead of John Dory, she started to aggravate her team with her continual shouts and nit-picking, returning a number of dishes to sous chef Scott, who became extremely annoyed with her (even expressing a desire at one point to "punch her in the face"). Overall, there were no serious errors or returns, and the service was very successful. Ramsay asked what was different about himself later that night, and after a couple of panicky responses, Ramsay pointed out that he was smiling for the first time that season (not counting, of course, his involvement in the rewards following the challenges). Elimination: Each contestant chose who should leave Hell's Kitchen. Danny and Paula chose Andrea, who chose Danny. Paula was happy that she had not been selected by her teammates for elimination but also remarked that she therefore would have the deciding vote. Ramsay eliminated Andrea, but praised her tenacity and skill as a chef and told her that she would do well in her career, leaving Paula and Danny to advance to the final service. Ramsay gave no comment for Andrea's elimination but her hooked up jacket and burnt picture was seen in the recap episode. Andrea's comment: "Hell's Kitchen for me has been one intense ride. I have given everything that I possibly could. I definitely have been through some gnarly moments. But that's what life is about. It's about figuring who you are, how much you can take, how much you've grown. I came, I performed, I gave it my best, and I'm taking the bronze home, as far as I'm concerned. I leave with no bitter taste in my mouth. I leave with no regrets whatsoever."
62	14	"2 Chefs Compete"	May 7, 2009	6.50
Remodeling: As with previous seasons, Hell's Kitchen was split into two restaurants, with each contestant running their side and deciding the menu and decor. While Danny and Paula prepared to leave Hell's Kitchen, their relatives (Danny's father and girlfriend, Paula's mother and sister) oversaw construction for their respective restaurants. Danny's restaurant was named "Velvet Hammer", after his own nickname from high school and featured a seafood menu and decor, which many of the returning chefs deemed tacky. One of Danny's ideas, mounted fish, wasn't well received by designer John Janavs and he feared the restaurant would be more like 'Bob's Bait Shop.' Paula's restaurant was called "Sunergy", whose decor included many shades of dark orange and yellow with candles on the wall. Despite her insistence on using real candles, the fire marshal said real candles that close to the wall would be a violation of safety code so electric candles were used instead. Challenge: Danny and Paula were flown back to the Borgata in Atlantic City, where they had 45 minutes to cook three dishes from the menus that they had created, with Borgata executives choosing the best dishes. All of this was done within view of the Borgata's 500 employees, who would eventually work under the winner. Danny won the challenge 2-1. Reward: Upon returning to Los Angeles, Ramsay surprised the final two chefs on "key ingredients" at the table with domes on the top. When the domes were opened, the last six contestants to be eliminated, who were to be chefs under Danny and Paula's command in their restaurants, arrived at the kitchen. (Note: Robert did not return because of his illness; Lacey, as the last person to be eliminated prior to the final eight contestants, took his place.) Danny had the first selection and chose Ben, Giovanni, and Carol. Paula chose Andrea and LA, and was left with Lacey.
63	15	"2 Chefs Compete: Part 2"	May 14, 2009	7.37
Preparation: Following on from the previous episode, Danny and Paula briefed their brigade on assignments for their particular restaurant. Only Ben was particularly rooting for Danny to win on his team; Giovanni was annoyed at being invited back, stating he "did not care" who won, while Carol was secretly rooting for Paula. The finishing touches were given on the restaurants' decors and Ramsay tasted each restaurant's sample dishes while offering feedback. Paula became increasingly annoyed with Lacey on desserts, who twice curdled her creme brulees (including one served to Ramsay) and continually needed Paula's assistance. Service: Each restaurant served 50 diners, including Danny and Paula's relatives. All customers gave scores on the various aspects of their dining experience, and these were combined with Ramsay's observations in determining the winner. Both Paula and Danny had nervous starts, and each team had significant weak spots. Andrea repeatedly overcooked the halibut and scallops and Ramsay had to warn Paula to be vocal. Lacey got overwhelmed on garnish and earned even Ramsay's ire by complaining that the menu was too difficult to follow. Paula herself was criticized for jumping in to help her team as opposed to running the pass, though things picked up when she switched Andrea and Lacey's stations. On Danny's side, Carol overcooked lobster, Giovanni prepared salty sauce for the monkfish, and Ben was slow to deliver potatoes. Both Danny and Paula were able to rally their teams together to complete service. Although Danny finished service first, Paula did not care, as she was more concerned about the quality of the food rather than the speed at which it was served. Winner: Immediately after the service, Ramsay faked Danny and Paula by announcing that "The winner of Hell's Kitchen... lives in Florida" (as both came from Florida). Because Ramsay felt both services were completed with excellence and stated it was the best service they ever had in any final, he decided to utilize the customer comment cards to come to a decision. After everyone was dismissed, Ramsay summoned Danny and Paula to his office, where he praised both for their hard work, and said that they both will have a wonderful career ahead of them. Ramsay showed Danny and Paula the doors; the one that opened determined the winner. Danny's door opened, making him the fifth winner of Hell's Kitchen. Paula took her defeat graciously, and was happy that Danny won in honor of his deceased mother. Danny was shown tearing up in the confessional room as his mother couldn't be with him to see him win. In addition to the money and the position, Ramsay asked Danny if he knew the previous four winners had shown up that night and his picture was mounted on the wall as part of the show's new feature, the "Hell's Kitchen Wall of Fame", which included pictures of past winners. Paula's comment: "Danny, congrats man, you deserve this. Coming in second place in Hell's Kitchen is definitely not gonna stop me. So many doors are gonna open up. I am not one least bit upset right now. I'm walking out a winner." Danny's comment: "Unbelievable! This is the best I've ever felt, man. This is incredible. I can't believe it. I did it, man. I won. I'm going to be at Borgata in my own restaurant with a quarter million dollars. Like, holy shit. When the door swung open, and it's just the most amazing experience I've ever been through. I love my mom so much, and it's just so sad that she had to go before her time. But I know that she's looking down, crying with me, just saying, 'You know, that's my boy, man. I knew he was gonna make something of himself.' And here I am, dude, the winner." Ramsay's comment: "Danny won Hell's Kitchen because in a very short period of time, he grew more than any other chef I've ever seen. He now has the talent, the maturity, to become a great head chef. Borgata Resort should consider themselves lucky. I know I would."
