= Old World Village =

Mixed-use village in Huntington Beach, California, United States

- Neighborhood
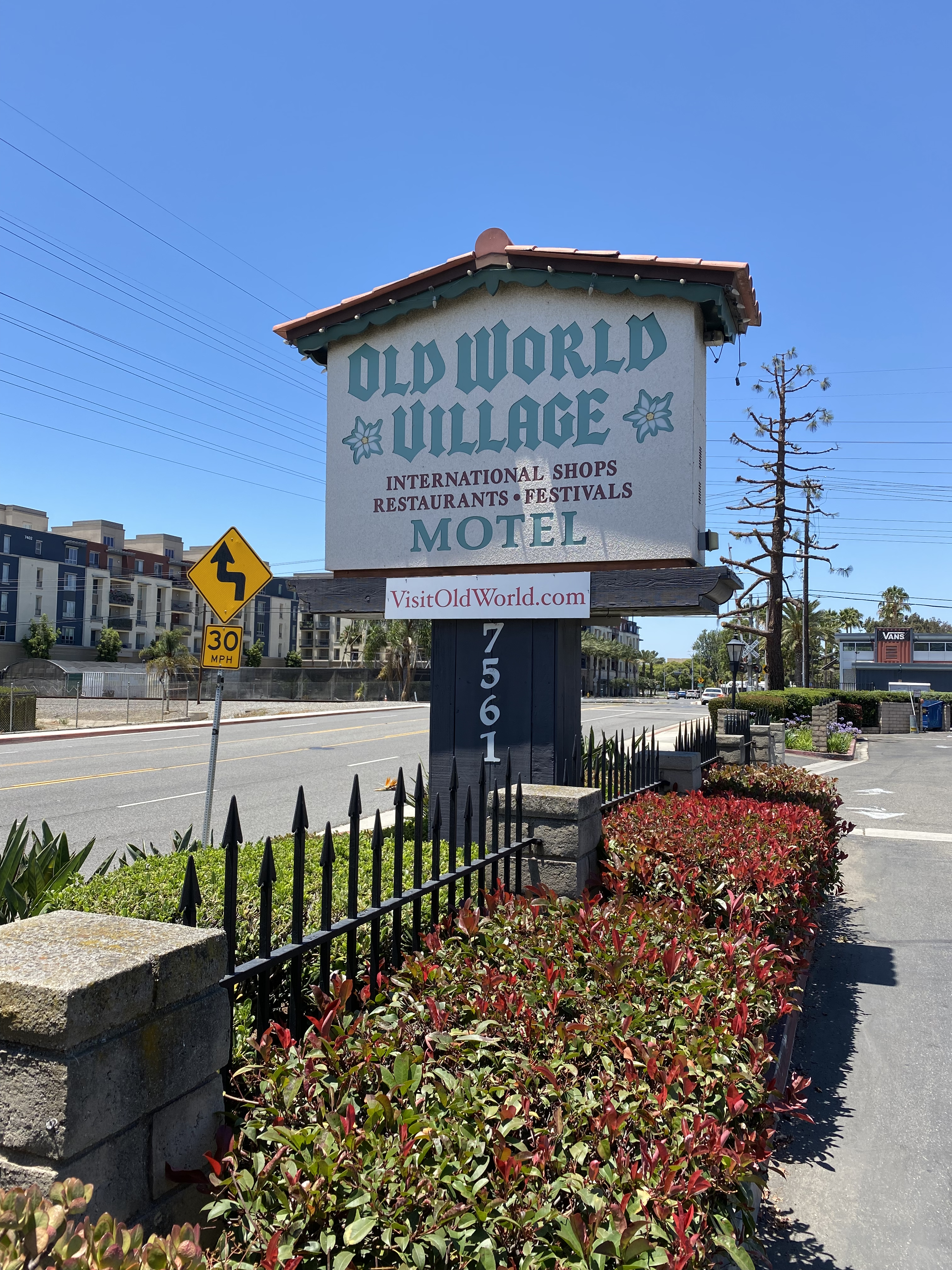
- Entrance sign to Old World Village

- Location within the Los Angeles metropolitan area
- Coordinates: 33.7347096°N 117.9969182°W
- Country: United States
- State: California
- County: Orange County
- City: Huntington Beach
- Founded: 1978
- Founder: Josef Bischof

Government
  - Body: Old World Owners Association

Area
  - Total: 8 acres (3.2 ha)
  - Land: 8 acres (3.2 ha)

Population
  - Total: 150 (approx.)
  - Density: 12,000/sq mi (4,600/km^{2})
- ZIP code: 92647
- Area code: 714
- Website: visitoldworld.com

Old World Village is a German enclave in Huntington Beach, California. It features shops, restaurants, a chapel, and a hotel. Many of the proprietors of its businesses live above their establishments. This live-work arrangement is unusual for Orange County.

About 40 families live in the village. When it opened in 1978, the proprietors were primarily from Germany and Austria, but the Village has become more ethnically diverse over time.

== History ==
In 1952, Josef Bischof emigrated from Germany to the United States. He was inspired by Ports O' Call Village in San Pedro to create the shopping center Alpine Village in Torrance in 1965. Wanting to have spaces to both live and work in the same place, he split with his business partners from Alpine Village to found Old World Village in 1978.

Ownership of the 53 live-work units is held by private owners, with governance administered by a homeowners association. As of 2007, the Bischof family continued to own several of the commercial and residential properties.

=== Controversies ===
In the 1980s, the village experienced an internal feud, with owners of the live-work establishments accusing Bischof of a "reign of terror". An initial $2.1 million judgment in favor of the merchants was later reduced to $1.25 million (equivalent to $3,670,000 in 2025).

In a separate case, Cathy Justine Adams, who operated the "Old World Psychic Reader" from 1985, was arrested and charged with grand theft after defrauding clients of over $400,000 in cash, jewelry, and vehicles. She pled guilty in 1991 to three felony counts and agreed to repay $150,000 in restitution to avoid prison time.

In the early 2000s, the owners of a Jewish gift shop reported a series of antisemitic incidents, including vandalism, threatening phone calls, and hate-related graffiti. The incidents gained media attention, though other people in the village described the community as generally peaceful.

== Description ==
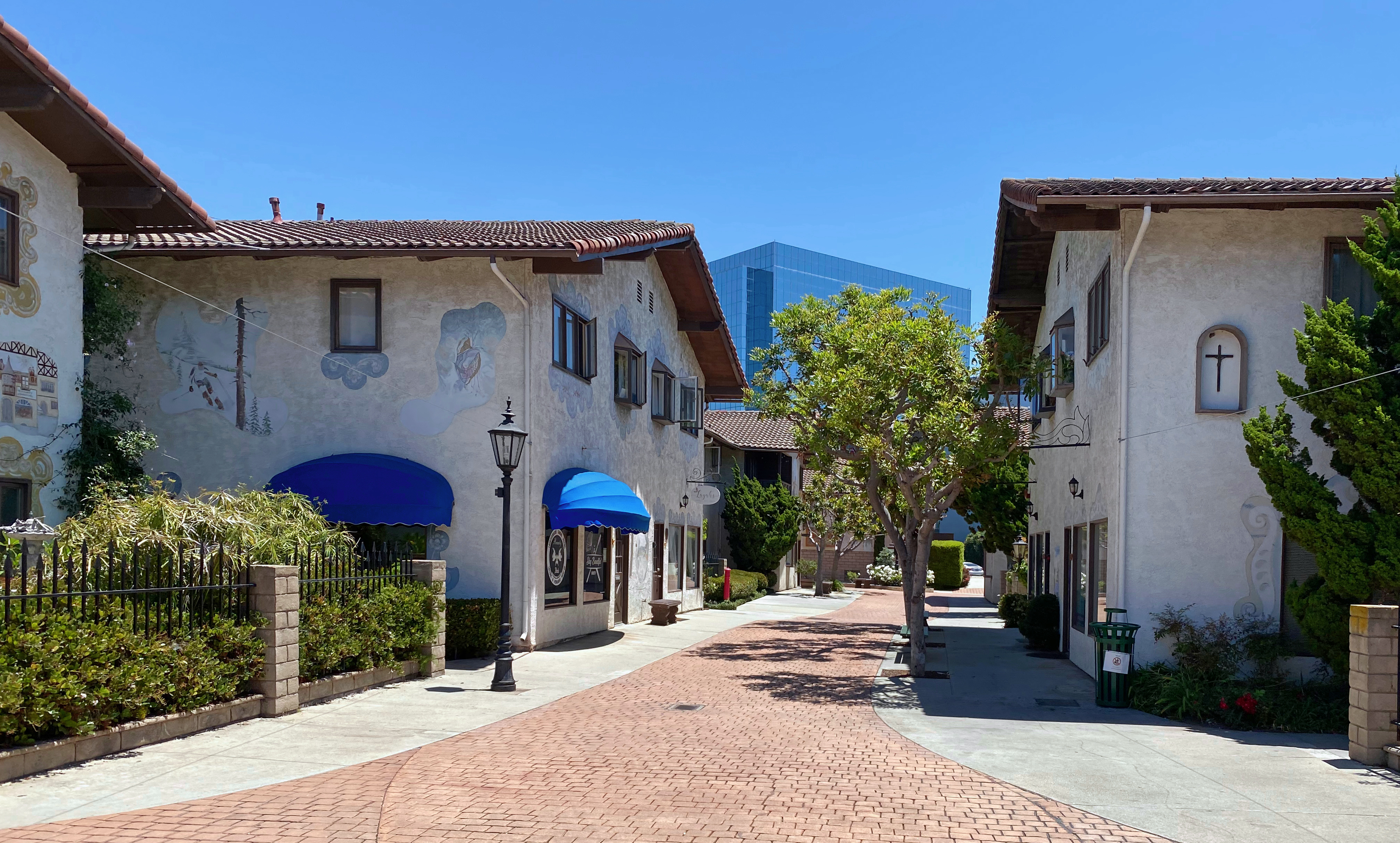
Shops and residences in Old World Village, 2021

Old World Village has shops, cafes, and event venues. Its architecture is a stylized version of a European village, with cobblestone streets, stucco facades, and painted murals.

== Festivals ==
The Village holds annual German events, including an Oktoberfest and dachshund races. Over time, events for other ethnic and cultural groups have been held at the Village, including Greek, Irish, Scottish, and South American festivals. The village also hosts weddings and quinceañeras.

== Legacy ==
Old World Village was parodied in the television series Arrested Development as the fictional English enclave "Wee Britain". The village has also served as a filming location, often doubling for European settings because of its Bavarian-style architecture. It has appeared in television shows such as Hell's Kitchen and Welcome to Chippendales, as part of Huntington Beach's efforts to attract film and television production.
