= Curry (disambiguation) =

Curry is a generic description for a variety of spiced dishes, especially from Asia.

Curry may also refer to:

== Places ==
=== United States ===
- Curry, Talladega County, Alabama, an unincorporated community
- Curry, Walker County, Alabama, an unincorporated community
- Curry, Alaska, an unincorporated community
- Curry, Idaho, an unincorporated community
- Curry, Pennsylvania, an unincorporated community
- Curry, Texas, a ghost town
- Curry County, New Mexico
- Curry County, Oregon
- Curry Canyon (Utah)

=== Elsewhere ===
- Cloncurry, Queensland, Australia, a rural town, known locally as The Curry
- Curry, County Sligo, Ireland, a village and townland
- Curry Island, Nunavut, Canada
- Mount Asphyxia, also known as Mount Curry, Zavodovski Island, South Sandwich Islands

== People and fictional characters ==
- Curry (surname), including a list of people and fictional characters
- Edward Aburrow Jr (1747–1835), English cricketer nicknamed "Curry"
- Charles Joseph Foley (1856–1898), Irish-born American baseball player nicknamed "Curry"

== Businesses ==
- Currys, a British electricals retailer
- Currys plc, a British electrical retailer holding company
  - Currys Digital, a former British electricals retailer

== Plants ==
- Curry plant, Helichrysum italicum, a flowering plant of the daisy family, with aromatic leaves
- Curry tree, with aromatic leaves

== Schools ==
- Curry College, a small private college in Milton, Massachusetts, United States
- Curry Normal and Industrial Institute, a former school for African Americans in Urbana, Ohio
- University of Virginia School of Education and Human Development, Charlottesville, Virginia, formerly the Curry School of Education

== Other uses ==
- Curry (programming language), a functional logic programming language
- Currycomb (or curry), a device used in currying (grooming) horses
- Curry powder (or curry), a spice mix often used in making curries

== See also ==
- Curry Village, California, a resort
- Curry Mallet, Somerset, England
- Curry Rivel, Somerset, England
- West Curry, Cornwall, England
- Kid Curry, nickname of Harvey Logan (1867–1904), American Old West outlaw and gunman
- Currying, a technique for transforming a function in mathematics and computer science
- Curie (disambiguation)
- Currie (disambiguation)
- Kari (disambiguation)
- Cury, a civil parish and village in southwest Cornwall, England
- Karahi, a type of thick, circular, and deep cooking pot
