= Kari =

Kari or KARI may refer to:

== Places ==
- Kari, Jhunjhunu, a village in Rajasthan, India
- Kari, Tchériba, a village in Mouhoun Province, Burkina Faso
- Kari, Tikamgarh, a town in Madhya Pradesh, India
- Kari, Iran, a village in Bushehr Province, Iran
- Kari-ye Bozorg ("Greater Kari"), a village in Ardabil Province, Iran

== People and languages ==
- The Gayiri people of central Queensland, Australia
- Kari people, also Cari, Aka-Kari or Aka-Cari, a tribe in the Andaman Islands, India
  - Kari language, also Cari, Aka-Kari or Aka-Cari, spoken by the Kari people
- Kari language, a Bantu language spoken in Africa
- Kari (name), real and fictional people with the given name, nickname or surname
- Kári, son of Fornjót, the personification of wind in Norse mythology

== Organisations ==
- KARI (AM), an AM radio station broadcasting on 550, licensed to Blaine, Washington
- Kenya Agricultural Research Institute
- Korea Aerospace Research Institute

== Other ==
- Kari or curry, a pan-Asian variety of dishes made of spices and/or herbs
- Kari Motor Speedway, Coimbatore
- Kari (moon), a natural satellite of Saturn
- Kari (music), a technique in shakuhachi music
- Karo-kari, a local term for honour killing in Pakistan
- Japanese torpedo boat Kari, more than one Imperial Japanese Navy ship

== See also ==
- Karie (disambiguation)
- Karri (disambiguation)
- Curry (disambiguation)
