= Curi =

Curi may refer to:

== Places ==
- Quri (Quiquijana), a mountain in Peru
- Mount Curi in East Timor

== People ==
- Humberto Curi (1905–1981), Argentine boxer
- Kriton Curi (1942–1996), Turkish engineer
- Leonidha Çuri (born 1951), Albanian football manager and former player
- Renato Curi (1953–1977), Italian footballer, died suddenly during a match
- Monique Curi (born 1969), Brazilian actress
- Katheryn Curi (born 1974), American racing cyclist
- Alexandre Curi (born 1979), Brazilian politician

== See also ==
- Cury (surname)
- Curry (disambiguation)
- Curie (disambiguation)
- Khouri or Khoury, an Arabic surname, of which Curi is a written form.
