= Marcel Marti =

Marcel Marti may refer to:

- Marcel Martí (born 1925), Argentine-born sculptor
- Marcel Marti (ski mountaineer) (born 1983), Swiss ski mountaineer
