= Cury (surname) =

Cury is a surname derived from the Latin word curia. It may refer to:

- Augusto Cury (born 1958), Brazilian physician, psychiatrist, psychotherapist and writer
- Brian Cury, founder and CEO of Earthcam
- Guy Cury (1930–2018), French hurdler
- Joe Cury (1928–1977), owner of the Mandarin Super Market and a resident of Mandarin, Florida
- Michel Cury Neto (born 1981), Brazilian footballer

== See also ==
- Curi (disambiguation)
- Curie (disambiguation)
- Petty Cury, a pedestrianised shopping street in central Cambridge, England
- Khouri or Khoury, an alternative of Cury
