= Kari (name) =

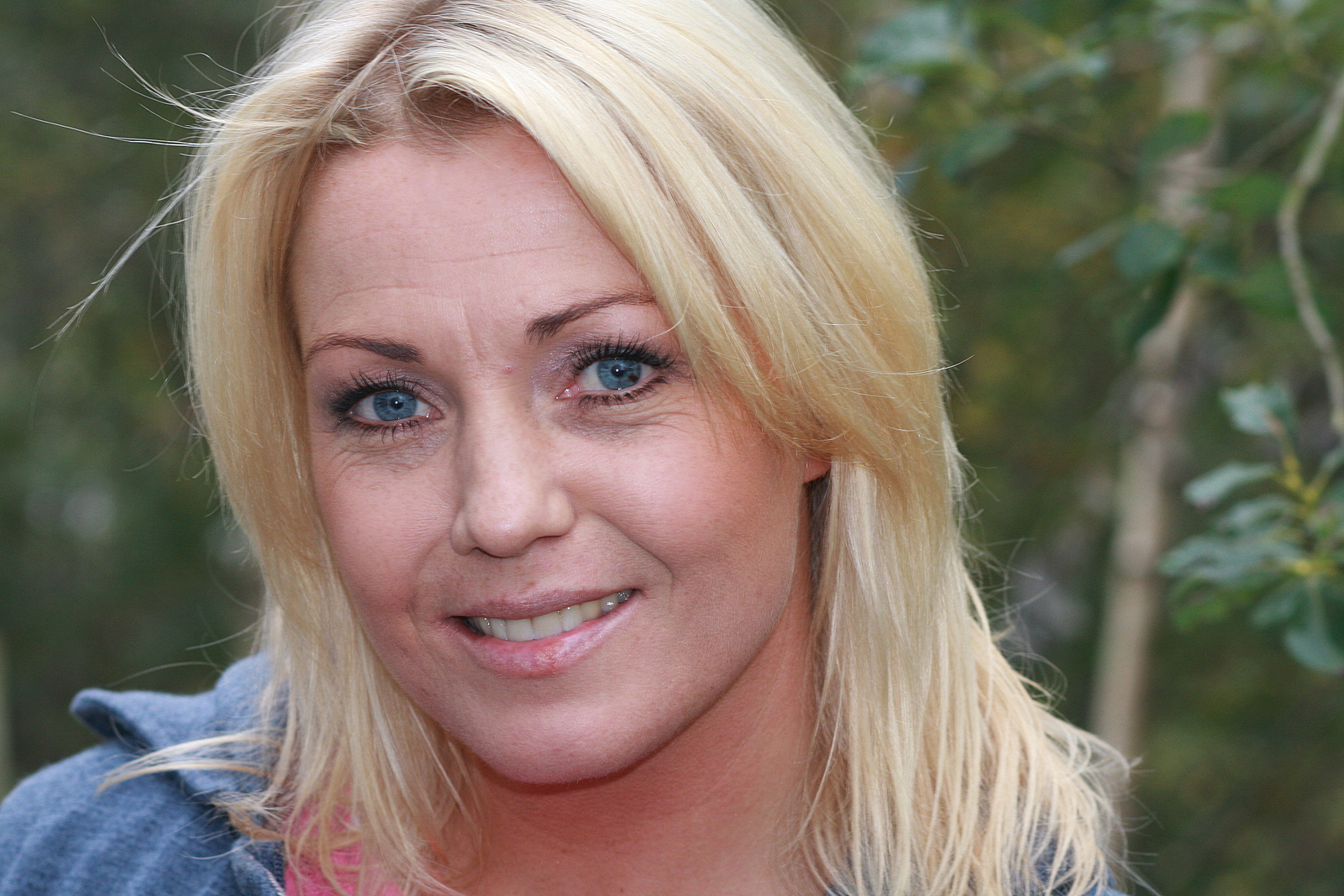
Kari Traa

Kari is a unisex given name and surname of multiple origins.

== Given name ==
In Finland, Kari is a male name, which was particularly popular in the 1940s and 1950s. The name is derived from the Greek Makarios (or Macarius).

In Norway, Kari is a female name. The name is diminutive of Katherine, meaning "pure". The corresponding Swedish and German name is Karin.

In Iceland and Faroe Islands, Kári is a male name, based on a Scandinavian god of wind of the same name. The corresponding Norwegian male name is Kåre.

In Japan, Kari is also used as a phonetic transcription of the pronunciations 果里, 華梨, and 嘉理, and is mainly used as a female name.

== Surname ==
Kari is a popular surname in South India. In Andhra Pradesh the village of Karivari Palem is named after the surname; in the village Inkollu, Gangavaram almost 60% families have this surname and belongs to Kamma/Chowdary caste. Kari can also be spelt Kahri.

Kari is also a Finnish surname, meaning a small island, islet, or an underwater rock. There are currently 2 173 holders of the name (2025).

== Notable people named Kari ==
=== Females with the given name ===
- Kari Aas (1886–1978), Norwegian teacher and Scout leader
- Kari Anderson (born 1982), Scottish cricketer
- Kari Sofie Bjørnsen (born 1967), Norwegian politician
- Kari Bøge (born 1950), Norwegian author
- Kari Bremnes (born 1956), Norwegian singer
- Kari Buen (1938–2025), Norwegian sculptor
- Kari Byron (born 1974), American television host and artist
- Kari Corbett (born 1984), Scottish actress
- Kari Diesen (1914–1987), Norwegian singer and actress
- Kari Dolan, American politician
- Kari Dziedzic (1962–2024), American politician
- Kari Faux (born 1992), American rapper and singer, born Kari Rose Johnson
- Kari Aalvik Grimsbø (born 1985), Norwegian handball player
- Kari Jobe (born 1981), American singer
- Kari Mette Johansen (born 1979), Norwegian handball player
- Kari Kjønaas Kjos (born 1962), Norwegian politician
- Kari Ann Lake (born 1969), American politician and former television news anchor
- Kari Lerner, American politician
- Kari Matchett (born 1970), Canadian actress
- Kari Nissena, American actress
- Kari Ann Peniche (born 1984), American model
- Kari Rueslåtten (born 1973), Norwegian singer
- Kari Baadstrand Sandnes (born 1969), Norwegian politician
- Kari Schibevaag (born 1978), Norwegian kiteboarder
- Kari Storækre (born 1950), Norwegian television personality
- Kari Swenson (born 1962), American biathlete
- Kari Sylwan (born 1940), Swedish actress, ballerina and choreographer
- Kari Tauring (born 1966), American folk singer, author, and teacher
- Kari Traa (born 1974), Norwegian skier
- Kari Wahlgren (born 1977), American voice actress
- Kari Wuhrer (born 1967), American actress

=== Males with the given name ===
- Kari Arkivuo (born 1983), Finnish footballer
- Kari Aronpuro (born 1940), Finnish poet
- Kari Eloranta (born 1956), Finnish footballer and ice hockey player
- Kari Enqvist (born 1954), Finnish physicist and writer
- Kari Hotakainen (born 1957), Finnish writer
- Kári P. Højgaard (born 1951), Faroese politician
- Kari Häkämies (born 1956), Finnish politician
- Kari Härkönen (born 1959), Finnish skier
- Kari Jalonen (born 1960), Finnish ice hockey coach
- Kari Kairamo (1932–1988), former CEO of Nokia
- Kari Kantalainen (born 1947), Finnish business executive and politician
- Kari Ketonen (born 1971), Finnish actor
- Kari Korhonen (born 1973), Finnish cartoonist
- Kari Korhonen (born 1943), Finnish mycologist
- Kari Kriikku (born 1960), Finnish clarinet player
- Kari Kuivalainen (born 1960), Finnish musician
- Kari Lehtola (1938–2019), Finnish major accident investigator
- Kari Lehtonen (born 1983), Finnish ice hockey goaltender
- Kari Makkonen (born 1955), Finnish ice hockey player
- Kari Mannerla (1930–2006), Finnish game designer
- Kari Mäkinen (born 1955), Archbishop of Turku
- Kari Peitsamo (born 1957), Finnish musician
- Kari Rajamäki (born 1948), Finnish politician
- Kari Ristanen (born 1958), Finnish skier
- Kári Stefánsson (born 1949), Icelandic founder of deCODE genetics
- Kari Suomalainen (1920–1999), Finnish cartoonist
- Kari Takko (born 1962), Finnish ice hockey goaltender
- Kari Tapio (1945–2010), Finnish singer
- Kari Tiainen (born 1966), Finnish motorcycle rider
- Kari S. Tikka (1944–2006), Finnish legal scholar
- Kari Turunen (born 1962), Finnish musician
- Kari Ukkonen (born 1961), Finnish footballer
- Kari Uotila (1955), Finnish politician
- Kari Väänänen (1953), Finnish actor and director
- Kari Ylianttila (1953), Finnish ski-jumper

=== People with the surname ===
- Dagur Kári (born 1973), Icelandic filmmaker
- Ehsan Kari (born 2002), Malagasy footballer
- Jarkko Kari (born 1964), Finnish mathematician
- Kaarina Kari (1888–1982), Finnish physician, gymnastics teacher and writer
- Martti J. Kari (1960–2023), Finnish military officer and academic
- Mika Kari (born 1967), Finnish politician
- Sax Kari (born Isaac Toombs, 1920–2009), American R&B musician and promoter
- Tamla Kari (born 1988), British actress
- Tommi Kari (born 1986), Finnish footballer
- Yannis Kari (born 2000), Comorian footballer

=== People with the nickname ===
- Sundaram Karivardhan (1954–1995), Indian motor sports promoter

== Fictional and mythological characters ==
- Kári, son of Fornjót, the personification of wind in Norse mythology
- Kari Grandi, Finnish advertising character
- Hikari "Kari" Kamiya, a character in Digimon media
- Kari Nordmann, Norwegian placeholder name
- Kari Sorjonen, main character in Bordertown, a Finnish crime drama TV series

== See also ==
- Kari (disambiguation)
- Cari (name)
- Kali (name)
- Karie (name)
- Karli (name)
- Karri (name)
