= TK company =

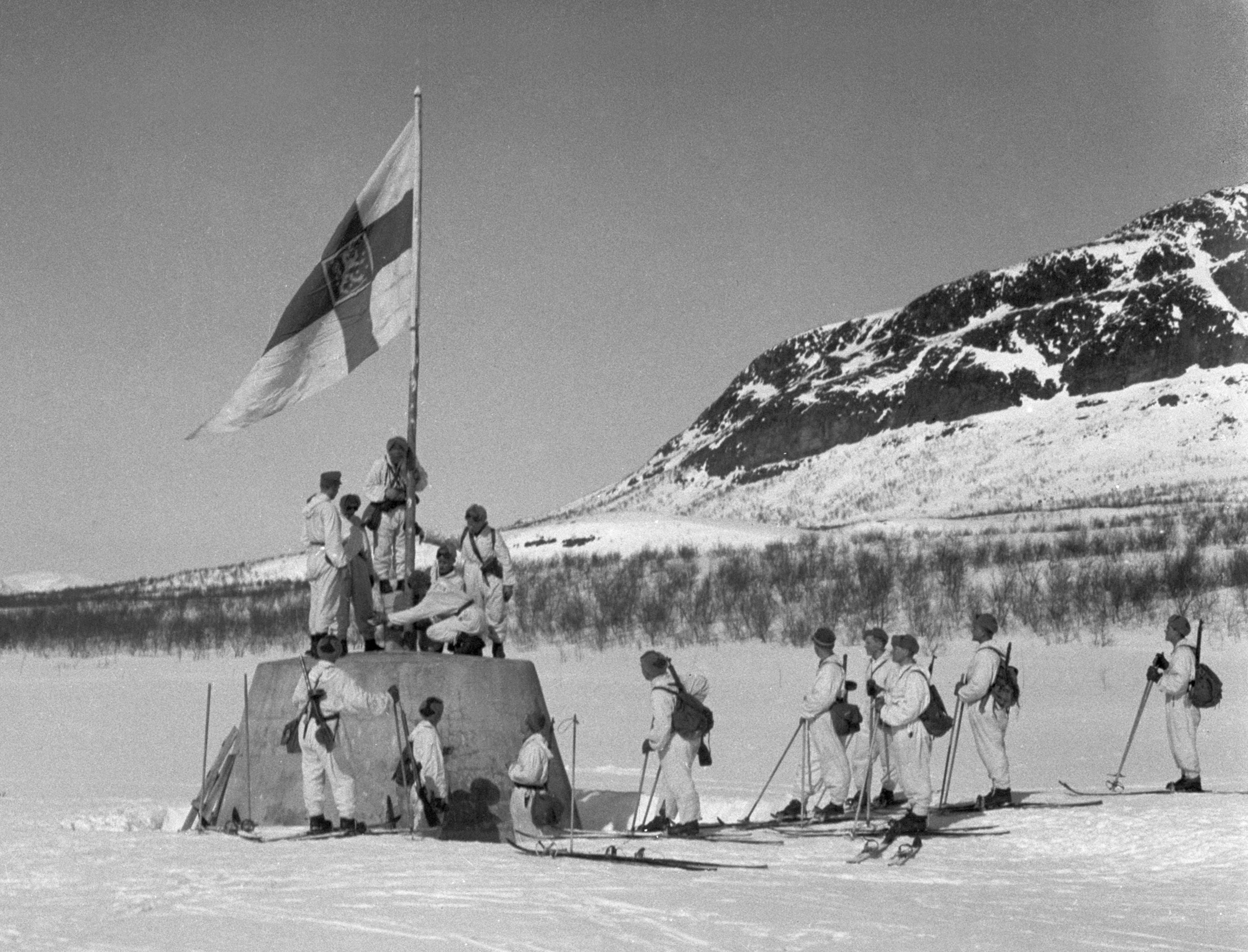
A Finnish patrol hoists a flag at the Three-Country Cairn on 27 April 1945 after the TK men had brought a larger flag and a better flagpople and organised the soldiers for the photograph.

In wartime Finland, TK companies (the abbreviation TK comes from the Finnish word tiedotuskomppania, 'information company') were units under the information division of the Finnish army founded before the Winter War, which were active during the Continuation War and the Lapland War. Soldiers working in the companies were called TK men (Finnish: TK-miehet), whose civilian professions usually were journalists, teachers or advertisers. Some of the men were notable authors, illustrators and radio reporters. They acted as war correspondents, war reporters, cinematographers, photographers, illustrators, guides, announcers and announcement designers.

== Before TK activity ==
For the implementation of military reporting, the Information Centre of the Ministry of Defence was founded in 1934. It handled the first trainings of information men in 1937, with eighteen men. The course was led by a pioneer of the new form of battle, Lieutenant Colonel Lasse Leander. He had made a presentation of military propaganda in a meeting of the Finnish Advertising Union.

The Finnish Propaganda Association was founded in 1937, with members including Jaakko Lepo, V. K. Latvala, Sulo Kolkka, Pekka Tiilikainen, Enzio Sevón, Armas J. Pulla, Olavi Paavolainen, Mika Waltari, Ralph Enckell, Göran Stenius, Kalle Lehmus, Ilmari Turja, Eino Honko and Arvi Kivimaa. The chairman of the association was the advertiser V. K. Latvala. For practical activity, the association founded the private news agency Finlandia. The Propaganda Association was the first public relations organisation in Finland. The original purpose of the Propaganda Association was to advertise the 1940 Summer Olympics.

In 1938 a group of propaganda men were sent to Berlin, Germany on a study trip. The members of the Propaganda Association were called to additional training in autumn 1939. The subject of the training was putting the men into appropriate activities. 60 propagandists were trained before the Winter War.

In early October 1939 a propaganda department of the military headquarters and a state information centre were founded.

== Organisation and activities ==
The information activity of the Winter War belonged to the propaganda department of the military headquarters. The activity in the Winter War was not as professional as it later became. The TK organisation was founded during the Interim Peace from 1940 to 1941.

The idea for TK activity came from Germany, where the director of the information department of the military headquarters Kalle Lehmus became familiar with the propaganda activity and companies of the German army (Propagandakompanie in German). The word propaganda had a negative reputation in Finland, so the company used the term information instead.

The information companies worked under the supervision of the military headquarters in Mikkeli. The number of companies ranged from eight to twelve. The companies had 339 men at the start of the war and about 150 photographers served in active duty at the frontline. The assigned number of men in one company was 40, which included four photographers, two cinematographers and ten writers. In reality, companies often had fewer men.

The information department of the military headquarters gave its first order on 23 June 1941. It said that the mission of the information companies was:

to liven and inform the public behind the frontline, through the use of writings, photographs and films, the activity of the army at the frontline and at rest up to the activity of the service troops, and to make the entire people feel connected with the army battle activity daily and thus strengthen the people's will to win the war; to gather appropriate propaganda material of frontline conditions to spread abroad; to spread propaganda to the enemy in immediate connection to the frontline; to take care of the entertainment of our own troops for example by showing films and writing magazines, distributing newspapers and magazines to the troops of the army; to provide guidance for foreign reporters sent to the frontline.

== Photographers and writers ==
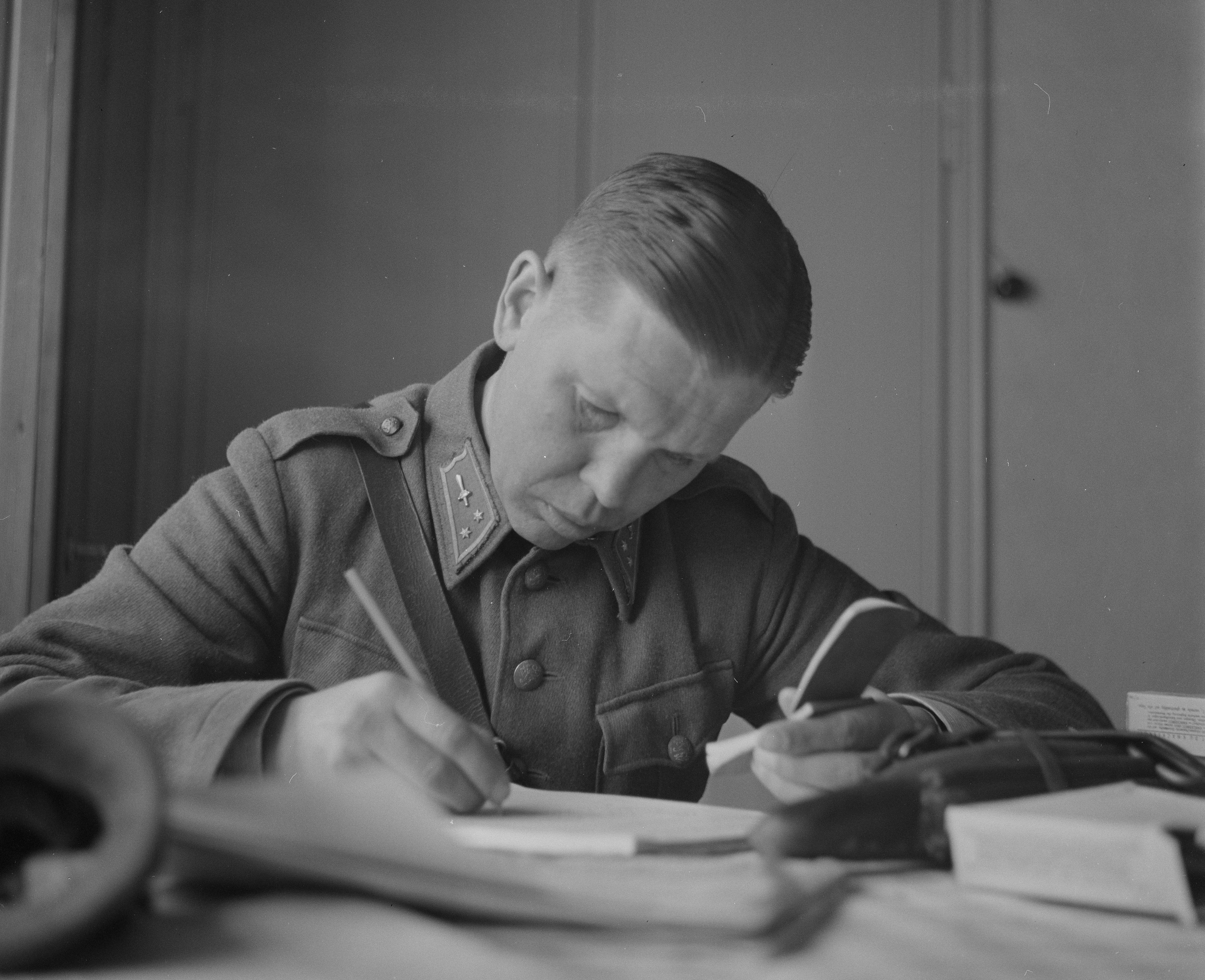
TK man Osvald Hedenström writing a photograph description in Savukoski in 1944.

TK images were pictures, drawings, paintings, photographs or films created by TK men or TK photographers. The image material from the Winter War was photographed by the frontline soldiers on their own cameras, even though all published material is classified as TK images.

TK men were selected based on their professional skills and their political stance. There were also numerous social democratic reporters among them, but although Olavi Paavolainen tried to convince the chief of the 1st information company Martti Haavio that known leftist socialists artist Tapio Tapiovaara and author Jarno Pennanen should be enlisted as TK men, they were not selected.

In wartime TK men participated in producing propaganda material of the war and its official documentation. The view nowadays is that the TK men recorded a historically valuable inheritance to the progeny.

The SA image archive consists of images from the Winter War, the Continuation War and the Lapland War. There are about 160 thousand photographs from 1939 to 1945 in the archive. Most of them were taken by TK photographers. The negatives and paper photographs were archive in the photography department of the military headquarters, where they remain to this day. This material has been digitised to the Internet to be viewed by the public.

== Wartime photography ==
=== Photographers ===
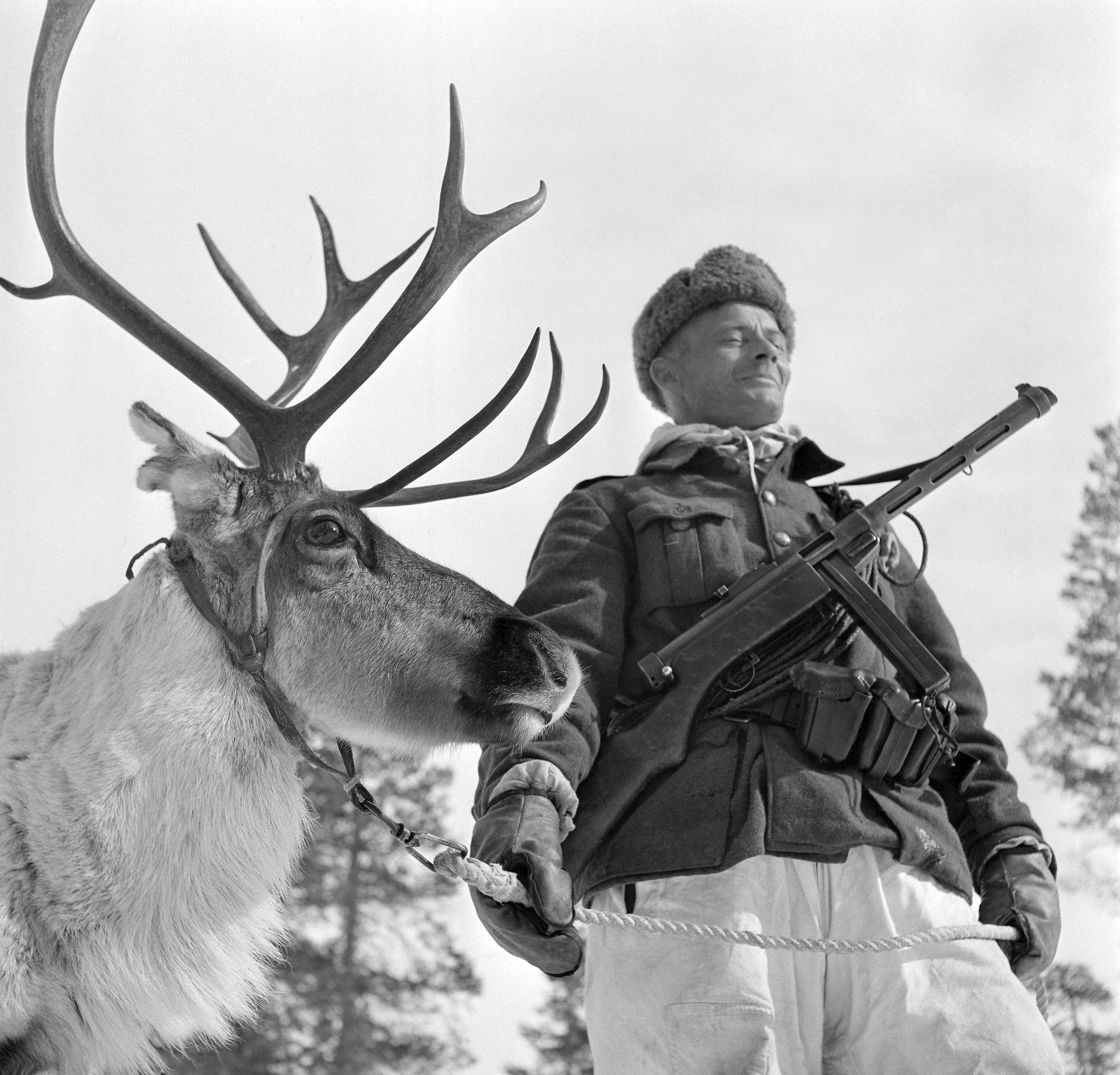
Sámi soldier Rájá-Jovnna with a reindeer as photographed by Osvald Hedenström in 1944.

Reijo Porkka says in his book Sodasta kuvin. TK-valokuvaus 1941–1944 (1983) that there were "about fifty" TK photographers in the service of the Finnish Defence Forces during the Continuation War. They were photographers active in the photography groups of the TK companies and in the photography department of the military headquarters. The latter seldom participated in actual photography.

All war photography material made and published during wartime activity was considered TK images. This also includes material by photographers who were not officially designated as TK photographers.

As martial law went into force photography at military theaters became restricted. About 700 photography permits were issued, but frontline soldiers also took photographs illegally. For example pictures of villages in eastern Karelia or their churches are valuable.

TK photographers had to observe things that had military, military historical or ethnological value. Ethnological material was important, as most of East Karelia had been conquered during the Continuation War. There was need to explain the need to return it to Finland with material presenting the long common history of the peoples. Military and military historical material had to present the Finnish soldier by showing traits and military activities common to him. Photographing disorderly behaviour or pranks was forbidden. Photographing demoralising subjects such as executions or the dead was strictly forbidden. However, it was expected of the photographers to photograph atrocities by the enemy and large enemy losses.

Men chosen as TK photographers were professional photographers or advanced hobbyists in their civilian life. Pioneers of TK-photographers included Osvald Hedenström, Kauko Kivi and Pekka Kyytinen as well as Paavo Jänis from Varkaus. Ensio Liesimaa and Erkki Viitasalo later had long careers as magazine photographers. One of the photography hobbyists was Kim Borg, who studied at the Helsinki University of Technology but quit his studies because of opera singing.

=== Equipment ===
Osvald Hedenström tells about his time at the Vyborg frontline: "I had an army Leica with me, which had a 400 mm Telyt and a stand." Photography equipment used in the war included Contax II and Contax III cameras originally intended for the 1940 Olympics. Reijo Porkka's book Sodasta kuvin mentions the film sizes used: 35 mm movie film, 6×4.5, 6×6 and 6×9. According to Porkka, there were 18 brands of cameras at the time. Basic cameras included Zeiss Ikon Contax, Leica, Rolleflex and Plaubel Makina. There was hardly any additional equipment, many TK companies did not have wide-angle lenses at all and there were only a couple of 13.5 cm, 18 cm and 40 cm telephoto lenses, most of which were the private property of the photographers. There were hardly any filters, and no exposure meters. It was expected of professional photographers to be able to calculate the exposure without the use of a meter.

=== Guided activity ===
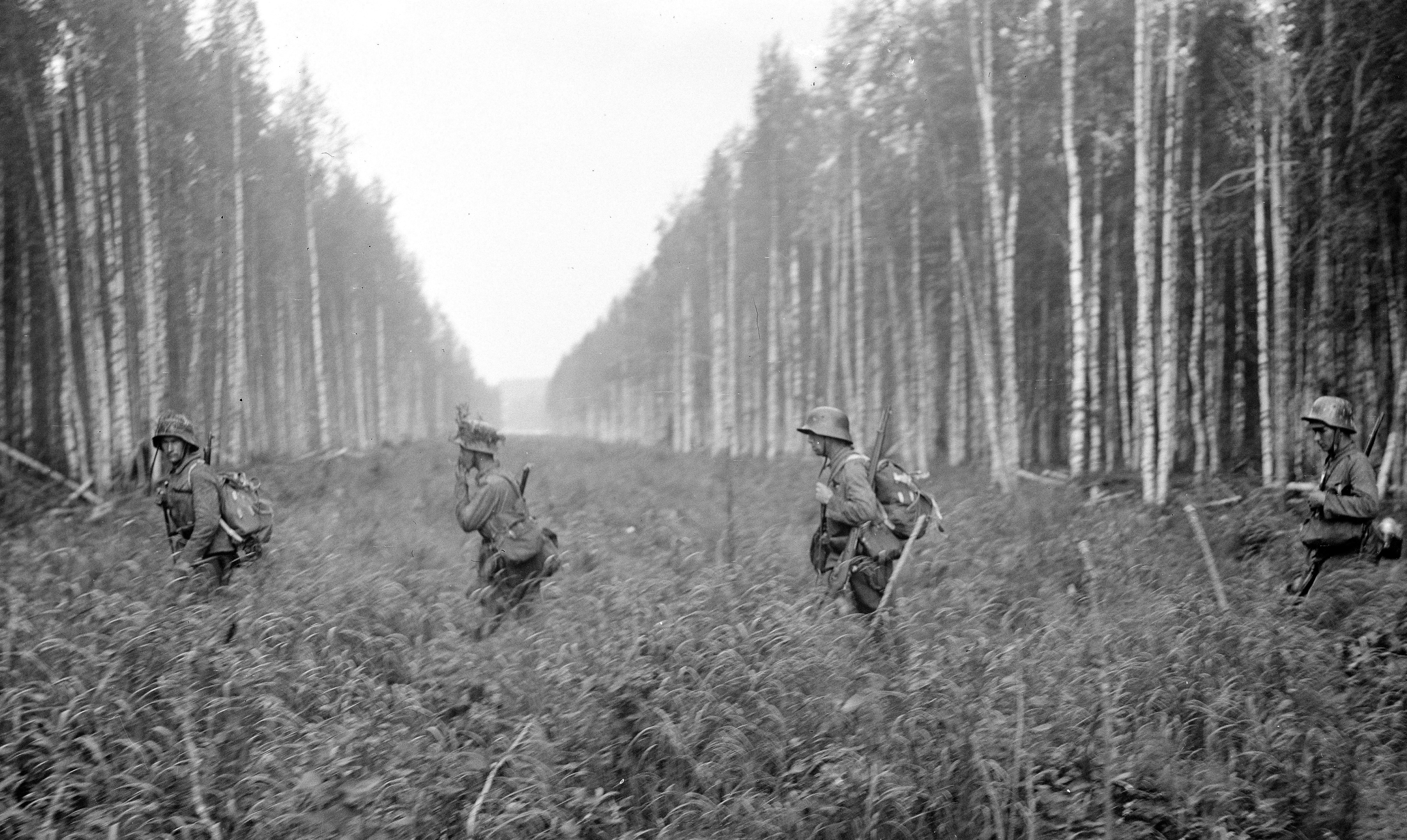
A photograph by an unknown TK man from summer 1941, when Finnish troops crossed the old border to Russia.

Photographers and writers could make long trips to the frontlines. The range of the information companies of the navy and the air force was the entire theater. The information department of the military headquarters gave orders almost daily, describing what had to be photographed and what must not be photographed. Often the photographers had to act on their own professional skill and intellect. This was not difficult for the TK men as they had already made a long career in photography in their civilian life.

The most important mission of the TK men was news coverage. This meant focusing information about the war and eyewitness reports to the people at home. As well as propaganda, the photographers recorded military history, in particular ethnological subjects after the conquest of East Karelia.

Photographers and illustrators were given verbal instructions, according to which they had to photograph primarily:

- subjects describing the advancement of military operations;
- the Finnish soldier so that traits and military activities common to him are shown;
- weapons in active use;
- fortification equipment and damage caused by weapons;
- diverse use of different forms of warfare;
- reconquered areas in the shape that they were when they fell to the Finnish forces;
- views of conquered areas as pure landscape photographs;
- pictures of east Karelian inhabitants that proved they were related to the Finnish people;
- subjects that proved the atrocity of the enemy and the greatness of their losses.

According to Helena Pilke, who has studied the photographs of the SA photograph archive, the photographs clearly show what subjects the military headquarters wanted to be photographed. In addition to battles, they were views of different localities, food provision, activity of the Lottas and service troops, artillery marches and logistics, throwing of hand grenades and Finnish tanks shooting at burning enemy tanks. Finland during the 1940s was very religious, so the TK photographs show many churches, frontline worship sessions and temporary heroic burials at the frontline in the attack phase. The photographs also show soldiers ranging from generals to privates, from frontline commanders to military runners, both in battle and in free time.

=== Military films ===
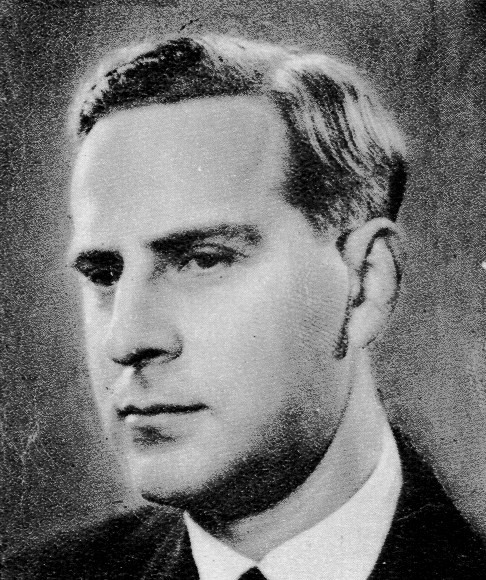
Cinematographer Felix Forsman also worked as a TK photographer.

The TK photographers filmed 88 documentary films about the attack and positional warfare phases of the Continuation War. The life of the civilian people at home was also photographed. News reports of the Defence Forces showed areas conquered during the advance to the east in 1941.

Felix Forsman photographed Carl Gustaf Mannerheim's visit to Germany in 1942, where he met Adolf Hitler, Hermann Göring and other important figures of Nazi Germany. Of the material produced during the visit, news report 52 was classified as forbidden after its completion, and remained as forbidden until 2007. The document Göringin sauva (2010) directed by Pia Andell describes Felix Forsman's secret mission to Germany. Forsman described his visit to Nazi Germany, where he visited filming of a film by Leni Riefenstahl. He said in his interview that a film can suggest and lie as much as it wants.

The battles to repeal the Soviet Union's great attack on the Karelian Isthmus and the evacuation of the Karelian people were photographed in June 1944. This was done by the photographers of the TK companies at the frontline and the TK photographers of the Information Department of the State and of the military headquarters in the capital area.

There is a DVD publication named Jatkosota ilmassa suomalaisissa TK-filmeissä (2013) about the material by the TK photographers on aerial warfare. The document includes photographs by Finnish TK photographers about military aircraft and aerial warfare. There are also photographs of the aerial defence of Helsinki, reconnaissance and bomber aircraft, and a photograph taken on board a Junkers Ju 87 "Stuka" aircraft.

=== TK illustrators ===
Olavi Paavolainen, who had been transferred to the information department of the military headquarters during the Continuation War, was responsible for the actions of the frontline illustrators. He was on good terms with the eccentric artists. There were few freelance artists as TK illustrators, but advertisers also served to further the pictorial propaganda.

In the beginning of the war, frontline illustrators received little attention, for example Suomen Kuvalehti only published its first TK drawings in October 1941. It was difficult for illustrators to portray battles during wartime, so they had to fight between the real and the imaginary. Artistically significant drawings were made during quiet frontier life after the attack phase. Buildings and forests destroyed in the war were popular military art subjects. Many of the best drawings were made in East Karelia, when the artists concentrated on recording the culture and landscape of the conquered areas.

The relation to the heroic idolisation of the Finnish soldier varied. Some artists avoided exaggeration and stuck to realism, while some made a conscious effort to further the heroic myth. Magazines often published drawings by Alexander Lindeberg, which were made to a selected portfolio in 1943. Lindeberg's style was similar to that of German propaganda artists such as Hans Liska. Liska's work was also known in the Finnish Signaali magazine. Among the most talented TK artists was Aarne Nopsanen, who was capable of expressing fast movement. The quality of the work of Finnish TK artists varied. Modernism was abandoned in favour of classicism and admiration, which furthered the official standpoint.

== Censorship ==
The activity of TK photographers was strictly controlled, but frontline soldiers could photograph freely. Censorship also affected magazine photographers, but not as greatly as it did TK photographers.

TK men moved on the frontline according to instructions by the military headquarters, all the way from Lapland to the shores of Lake Onega (Ääninen). Texts were first sent to Lokki in the Mikkeli headquarters, where the stories were examined in the department Tiedotus 1 and then in the Information Department of the State before sending them to magazines.

Every TK photograph and text was inspected in the military headquarters. Some of the pictures were forbidden during wartime. Pictures of the worst battle damage and of the victims of partisans were not shown to the people at home. Photography of sports competitions was also forbidden during positional war so that the people at home would not get the wrong image of the conditions on the frontline.

During the Continuation war, TK men wrote about eight thousand news reports. Over a thousand texts were left unpublished because of censorship. TK men wrote about battles and the free time of the soldiers. The people at home were attempted to be protected from the reality of the war, and censored texts were too horrible to be read by them. Censorship also slowed news down. For example news about the Vyborg–Petrozavodsk offensive were only published after one week.

== Famous TK men ==
- Heikki Asunta
- Arvo Alanne
- Kim Borg
- Gunnar Clément
- Veikko Ennala
- Erik Enroth
- Uuno Eskola
- Felix Forsman
- Martti Haavio
- Osmo Harkimo
- Osvald Hedenström
- Vilho Heinämies
- Nils Helander
- Unto Hämäläinen
- Eeli Jaatinen
- Eino Jäppinen
- Erkki Koponen
- Sigurd Laesvirta
- Björn Landström
- Viljo Marttila
- Eino Mäkinen
- Aarne Nopsanen
- Lauri Nurmi
- Onni Oja
- Olavi Paavolainen
- Oiva Paloheimo
- Otso Pietinen
- Uno Pihlström
- Paavo Poutiainen
- Reino Rinne
- Rolf Sandqvist
- Veli Siikala
- Olavi Siippainen
- Björn Soldan
- Kari Suomalainen
- Erkki Tanttu
- Erkki Tiesmaa
- Väinö Tiger
- Aukusti Tuhka
- Esko Töyri
- Unto Varjonen
- Einari Wehmas

== Pictures of and by TK men ==
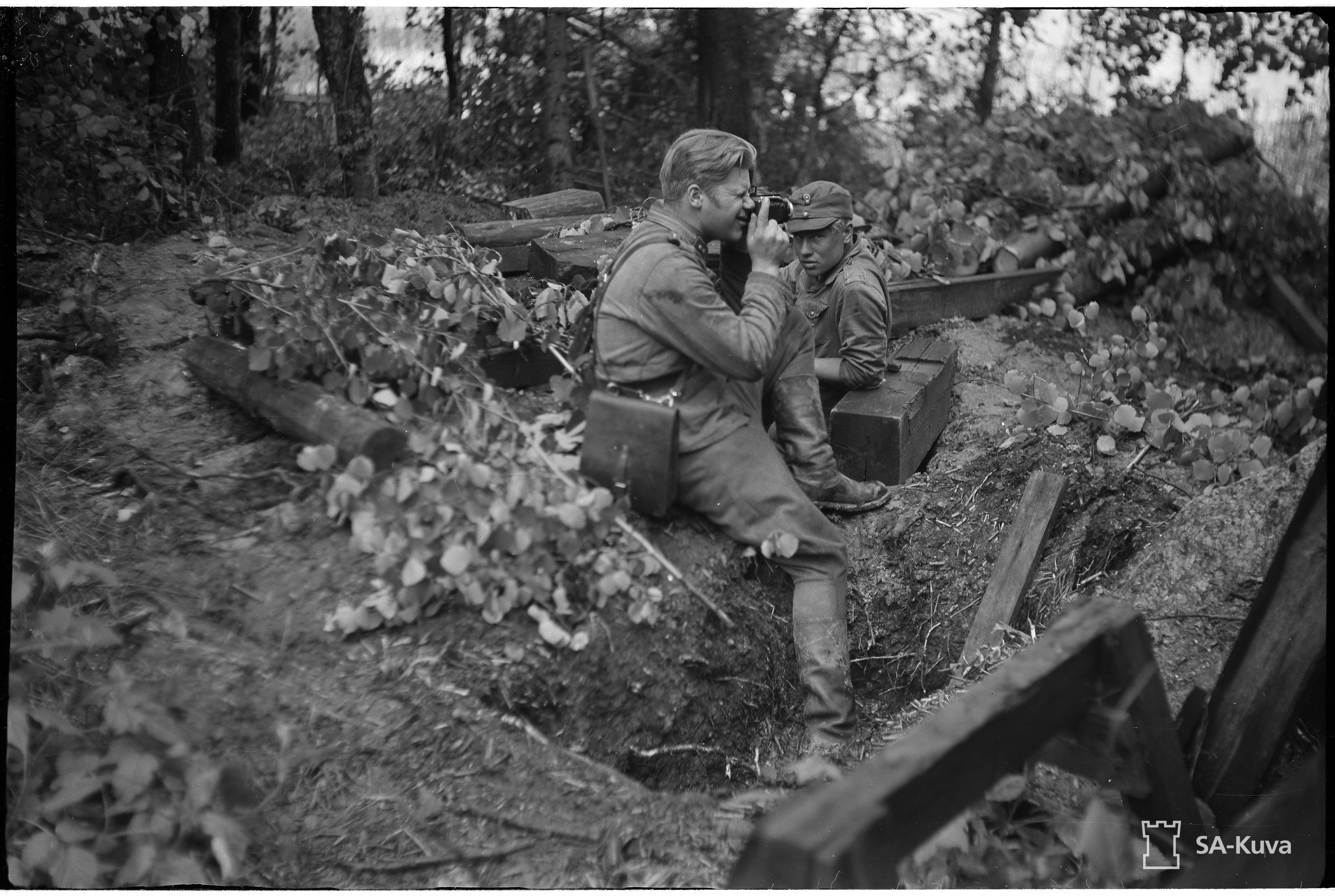
A TK man photographing at the frontline.

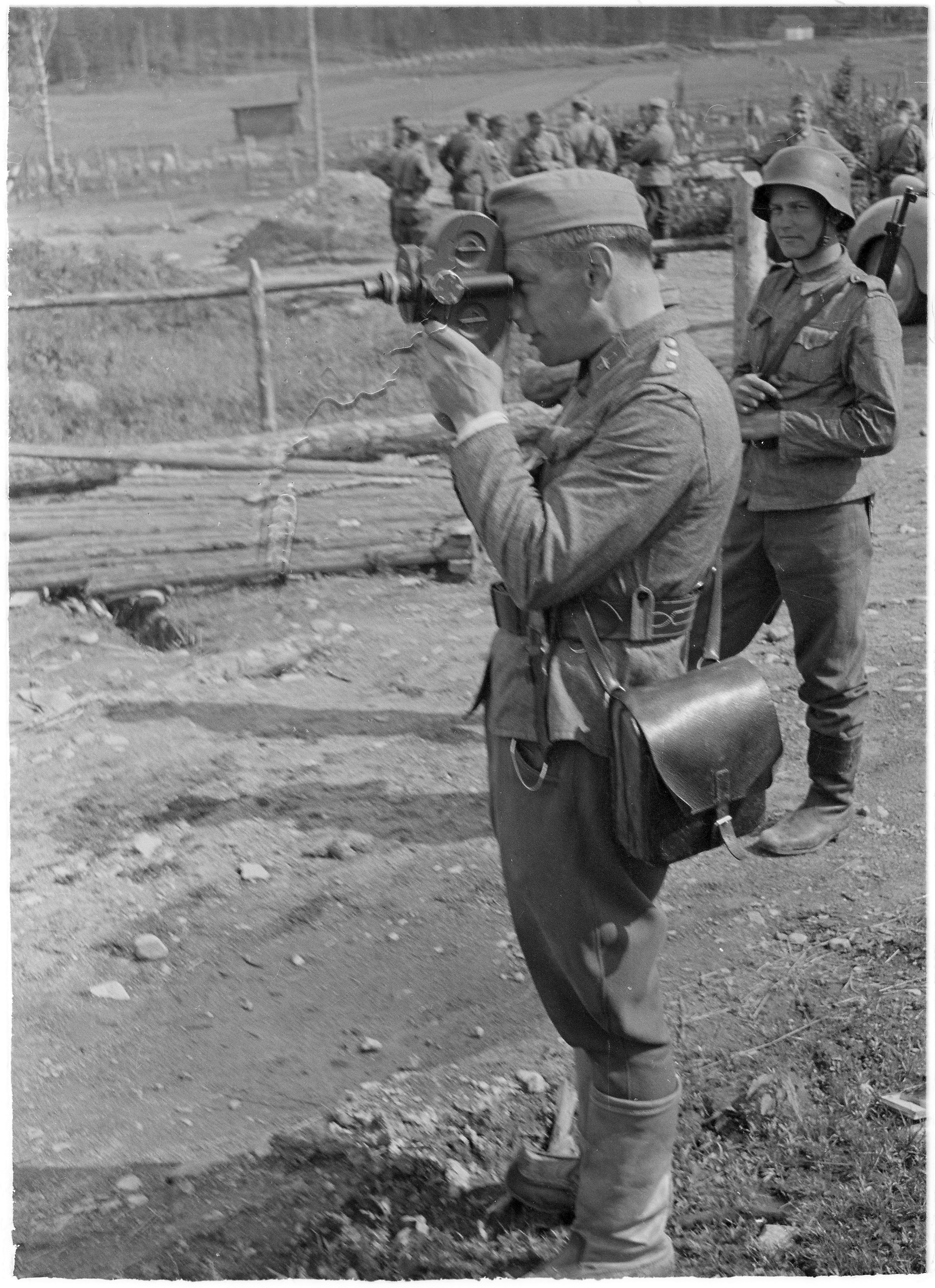
A TK photographer filming.

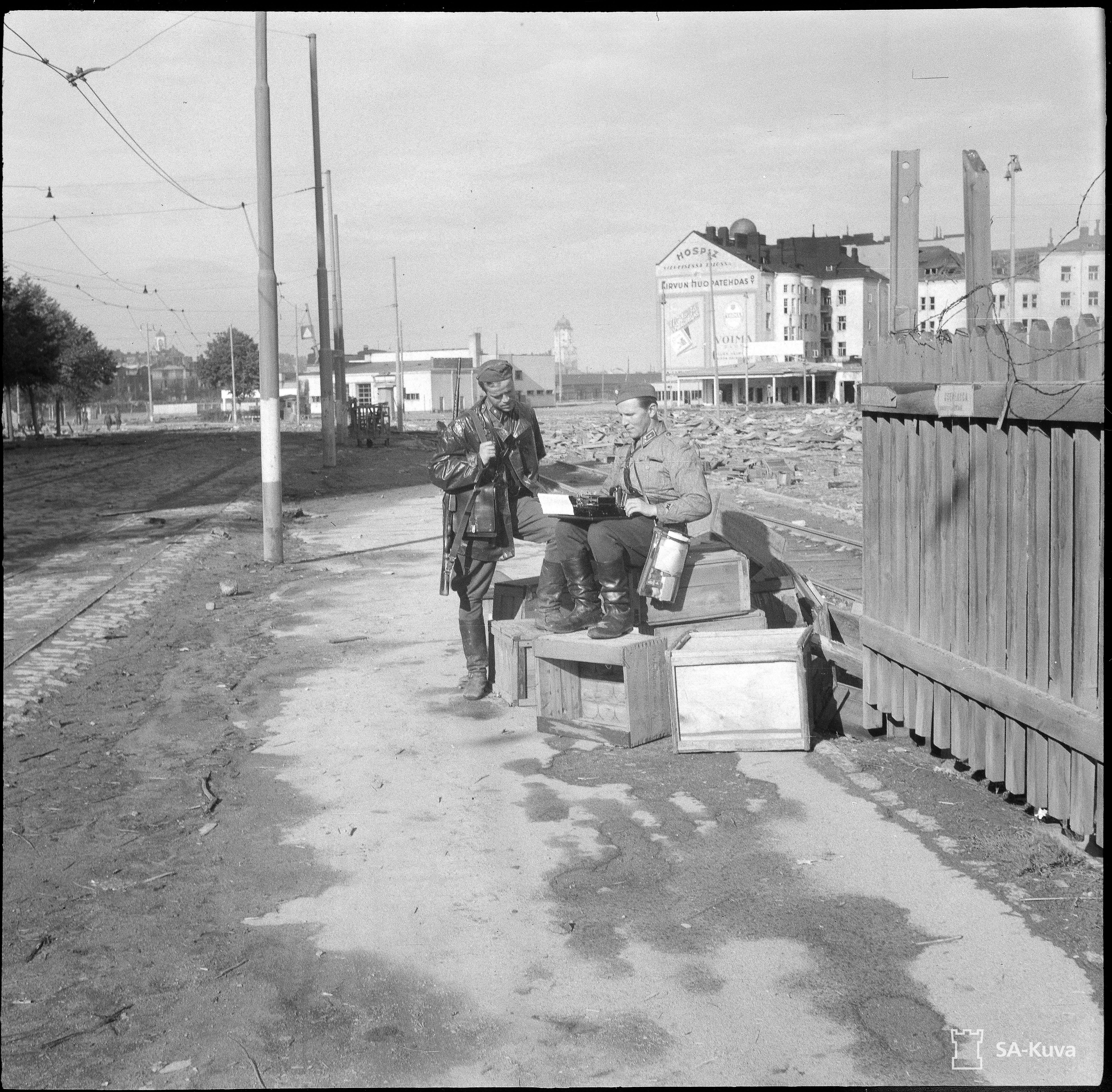
A TK man writing on Rautatienkatu street in Vyborg.

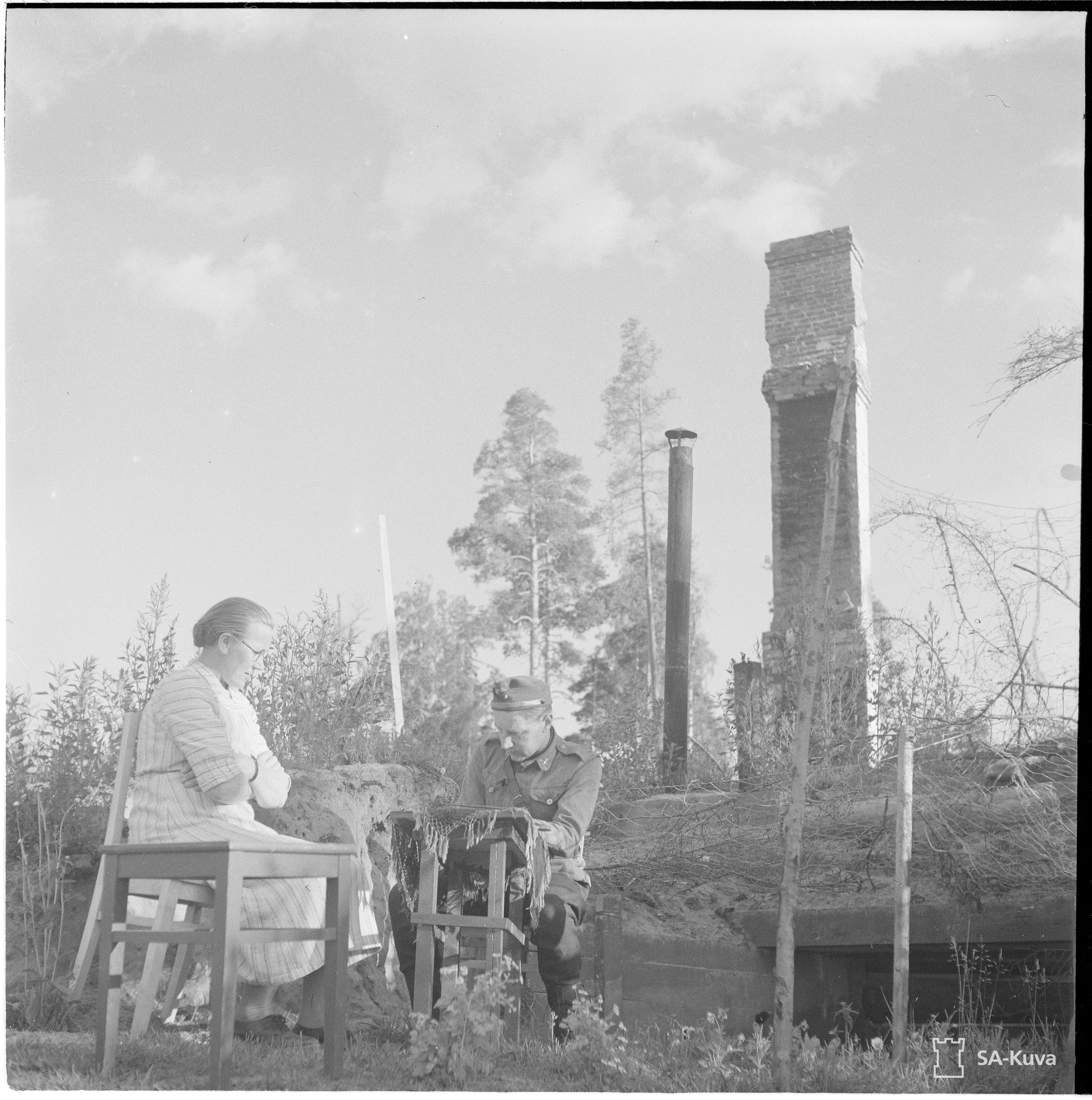
A TK man interviewing.

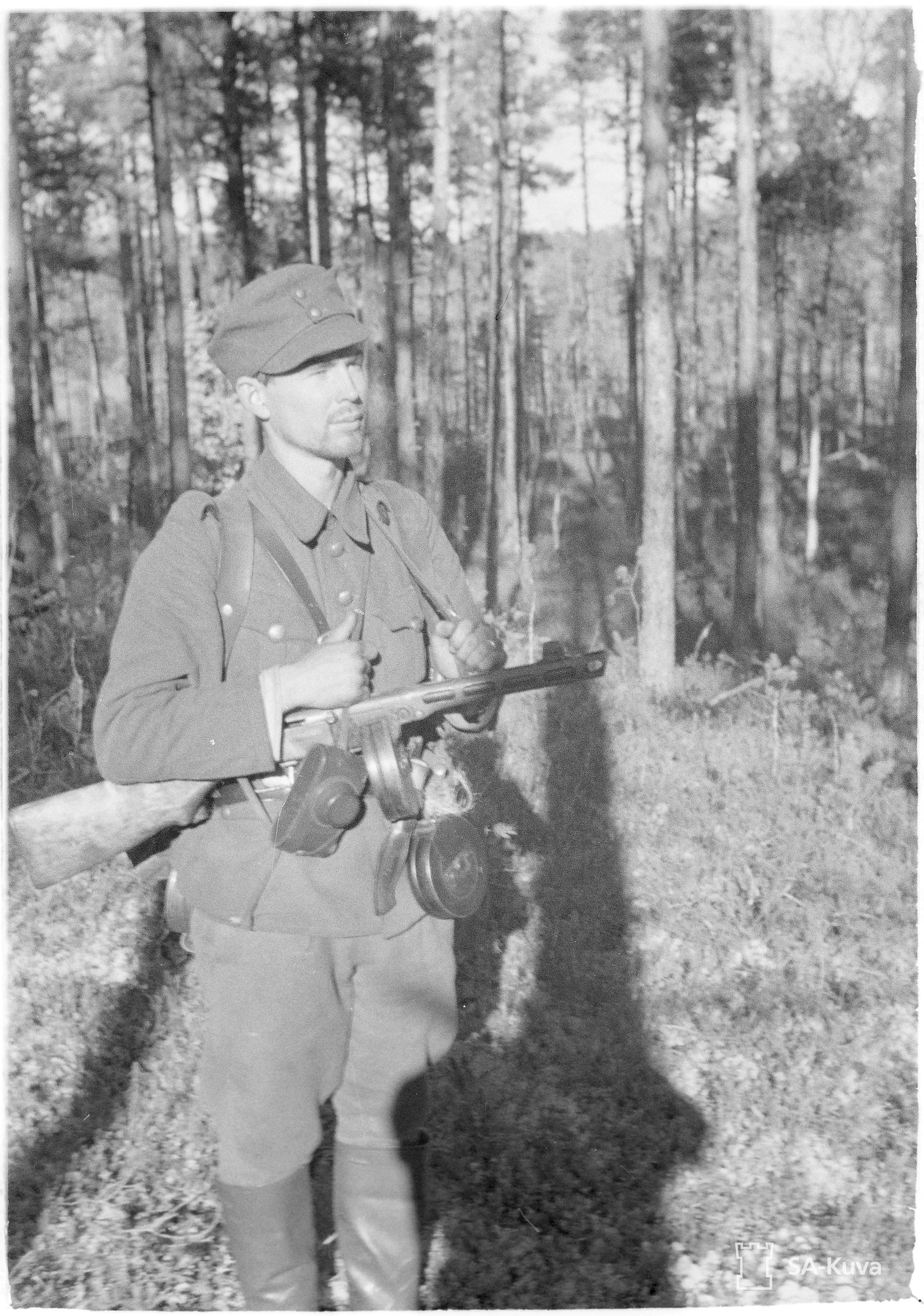
A TK man in patrol outfit.

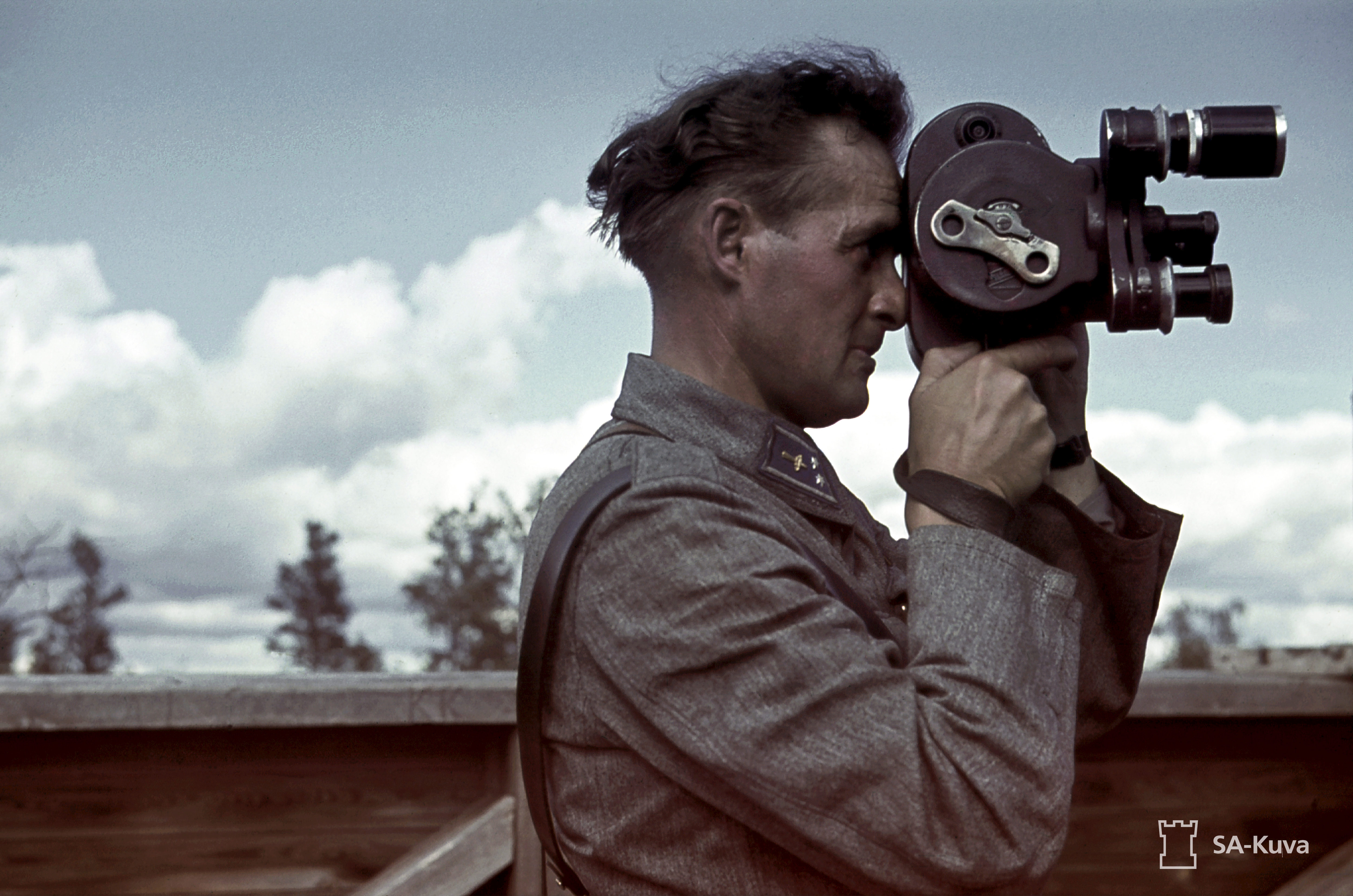
A TK man filming aircraft surveillance Lottas.

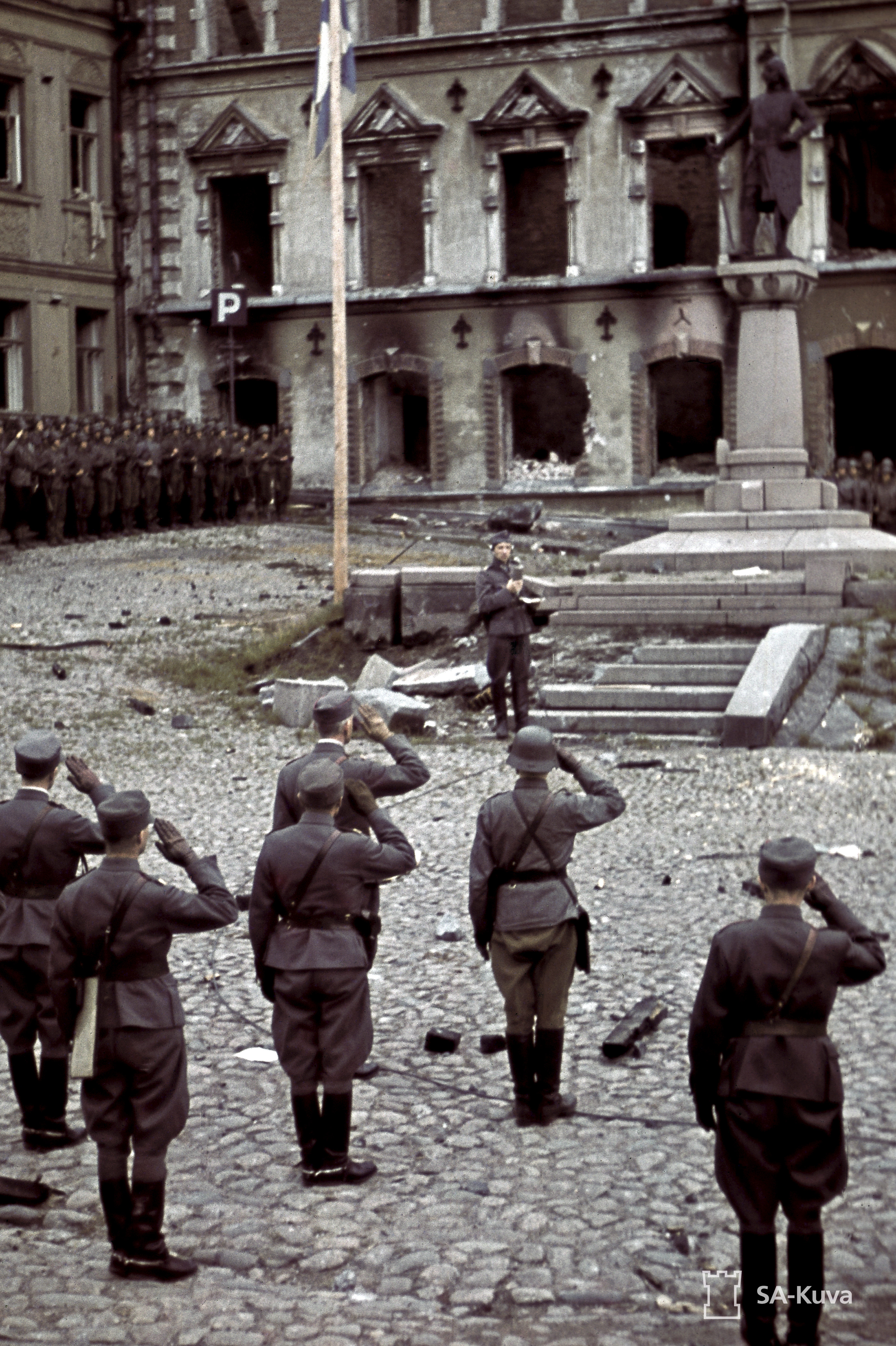
The conquest parade in Vyborg, a TK man in the middle commenting on the parade.

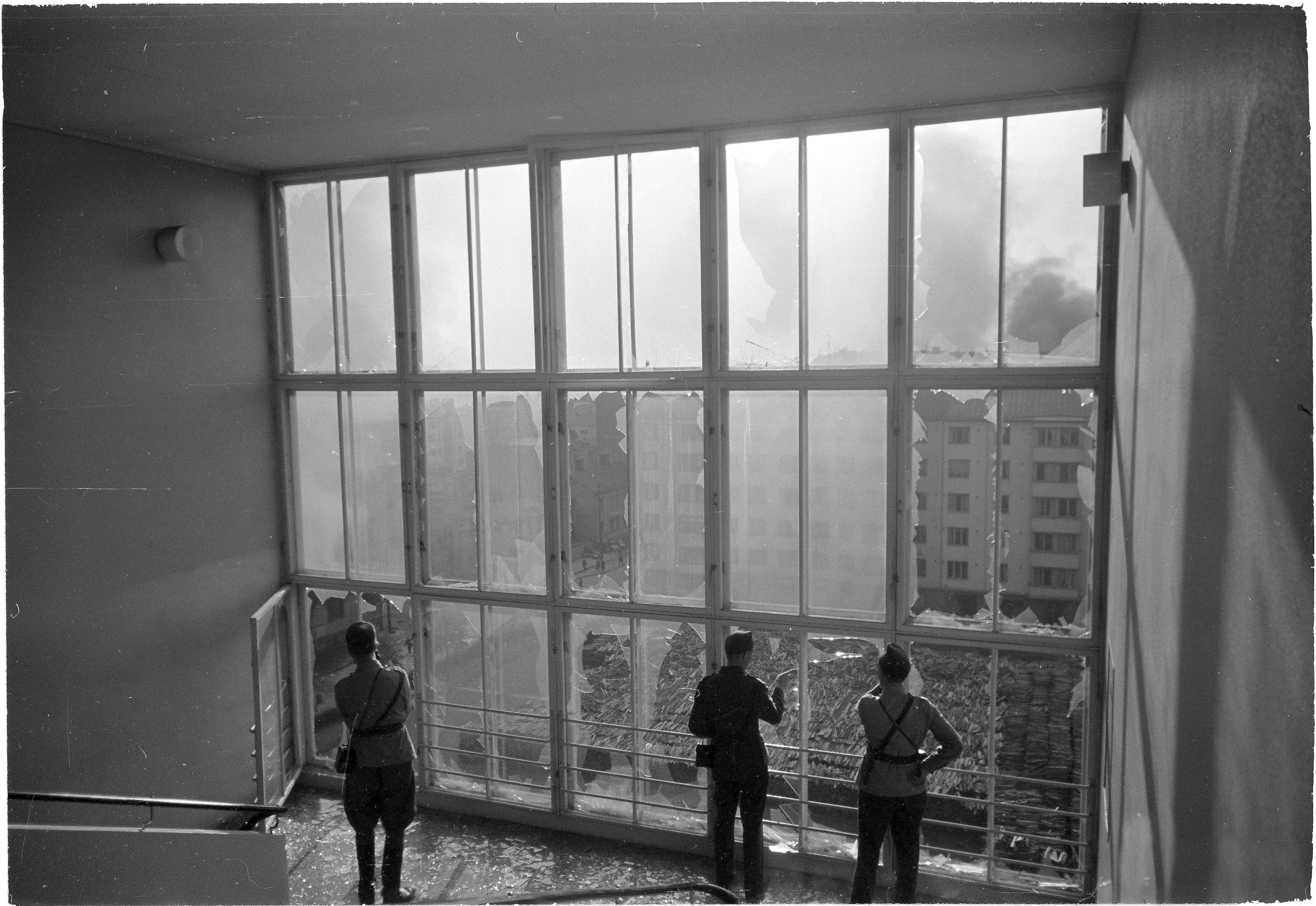
TK men photographing damage caused by bombing.

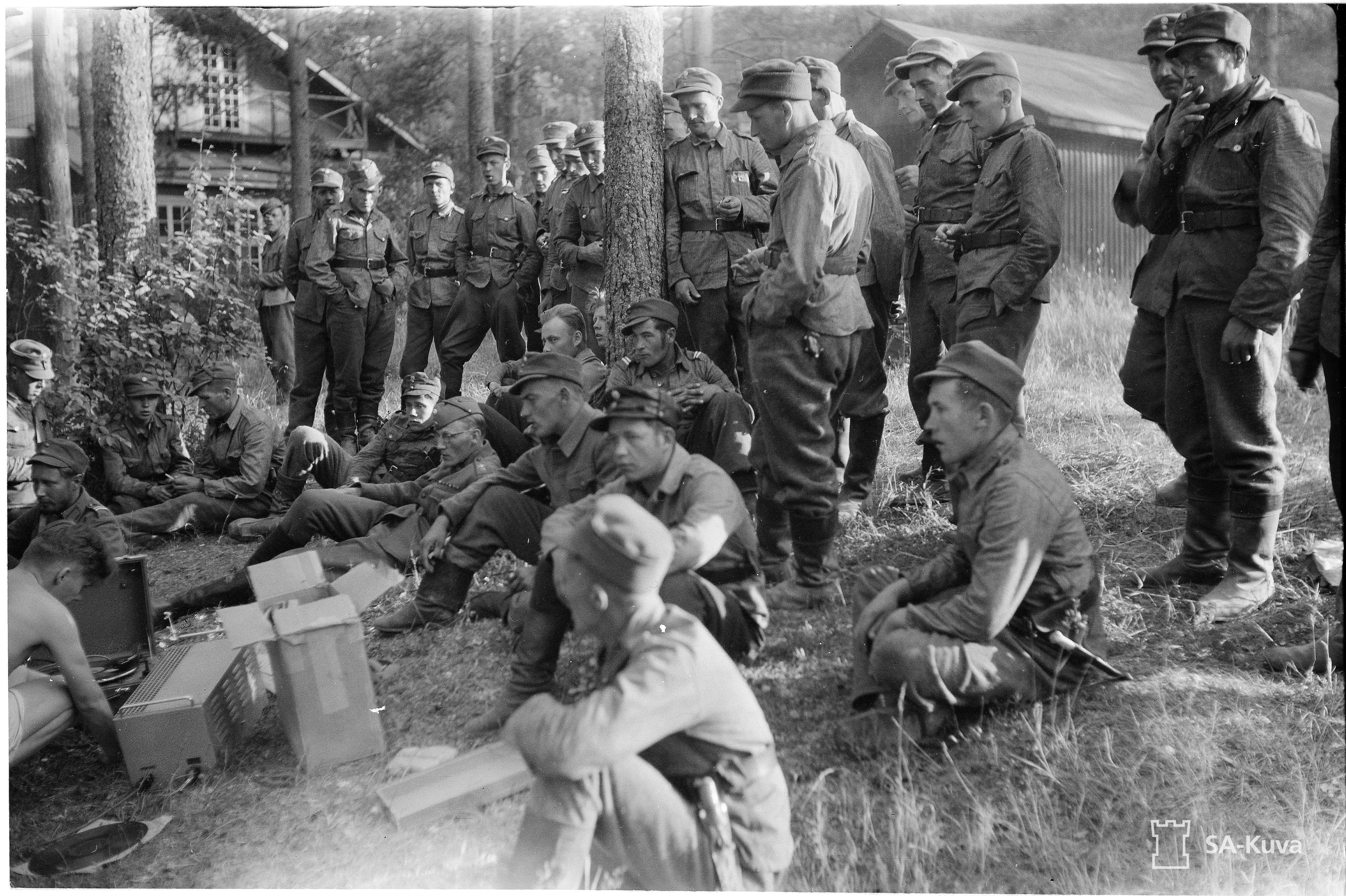
A military band playing music.

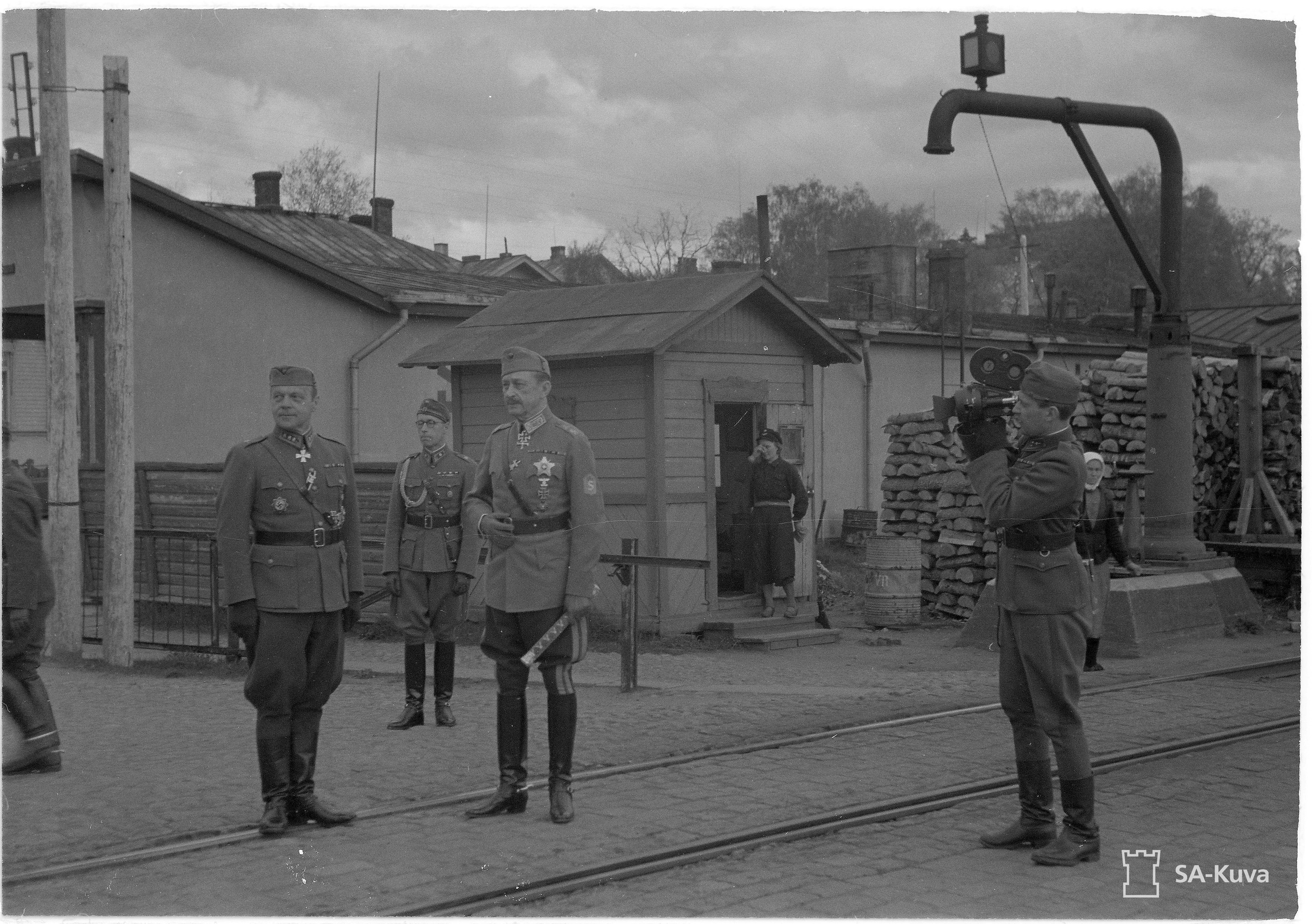
TK photographer Felix Forsman photographing Field Marshal Mannerheim and General Heinrichs at the Mikkeli railway station.

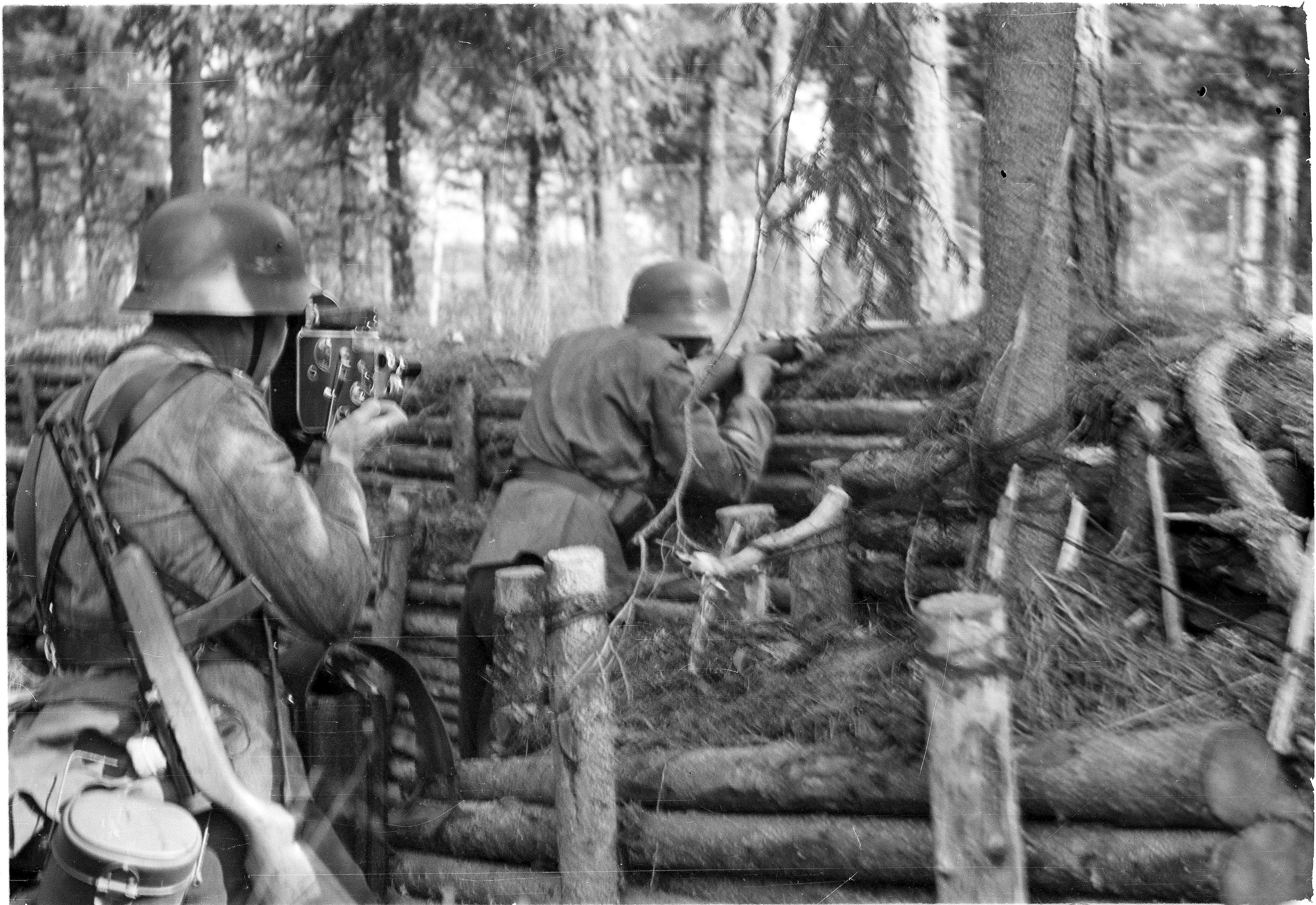
A TK photographer filming at the frontline.

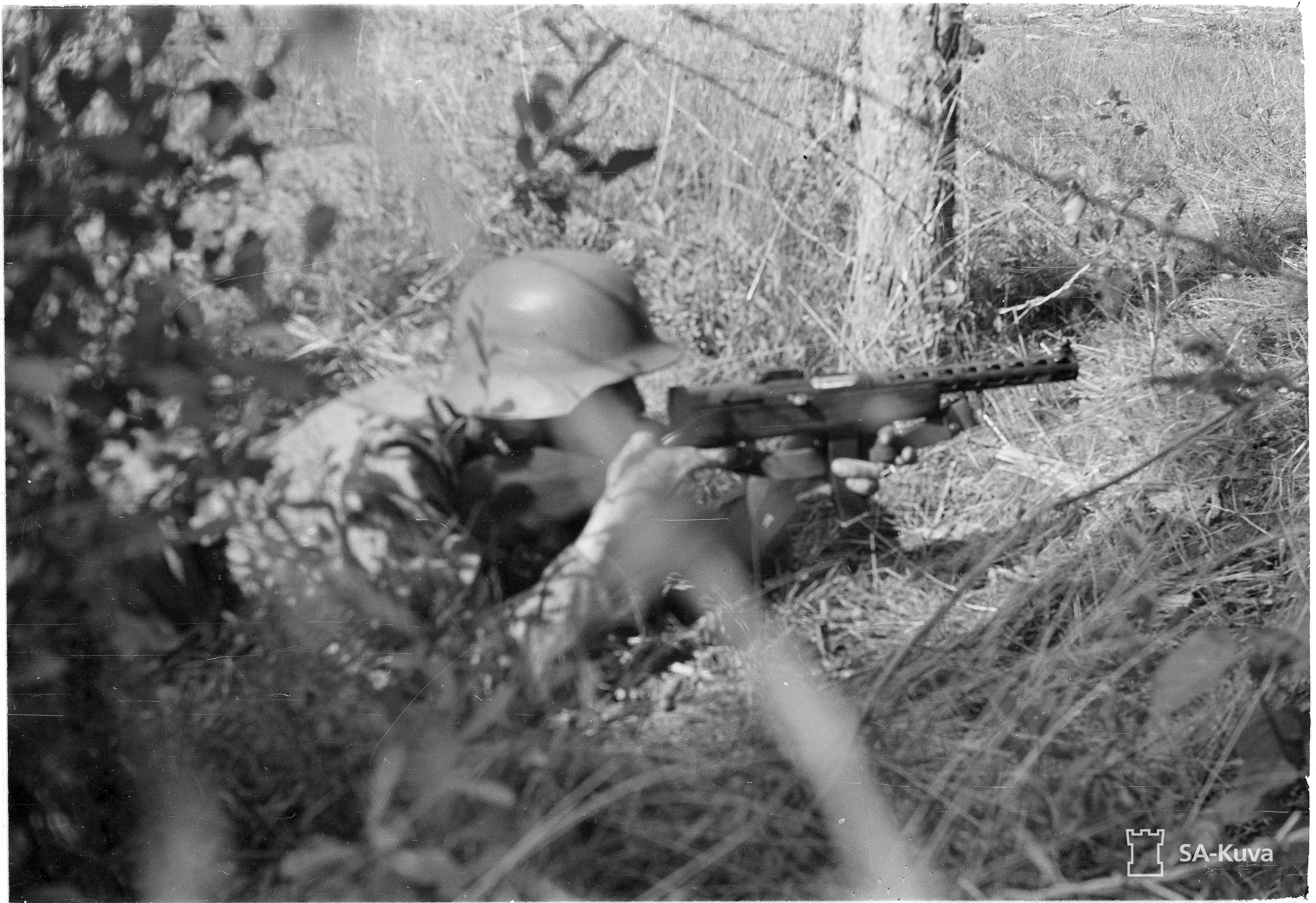
A strike company in position.

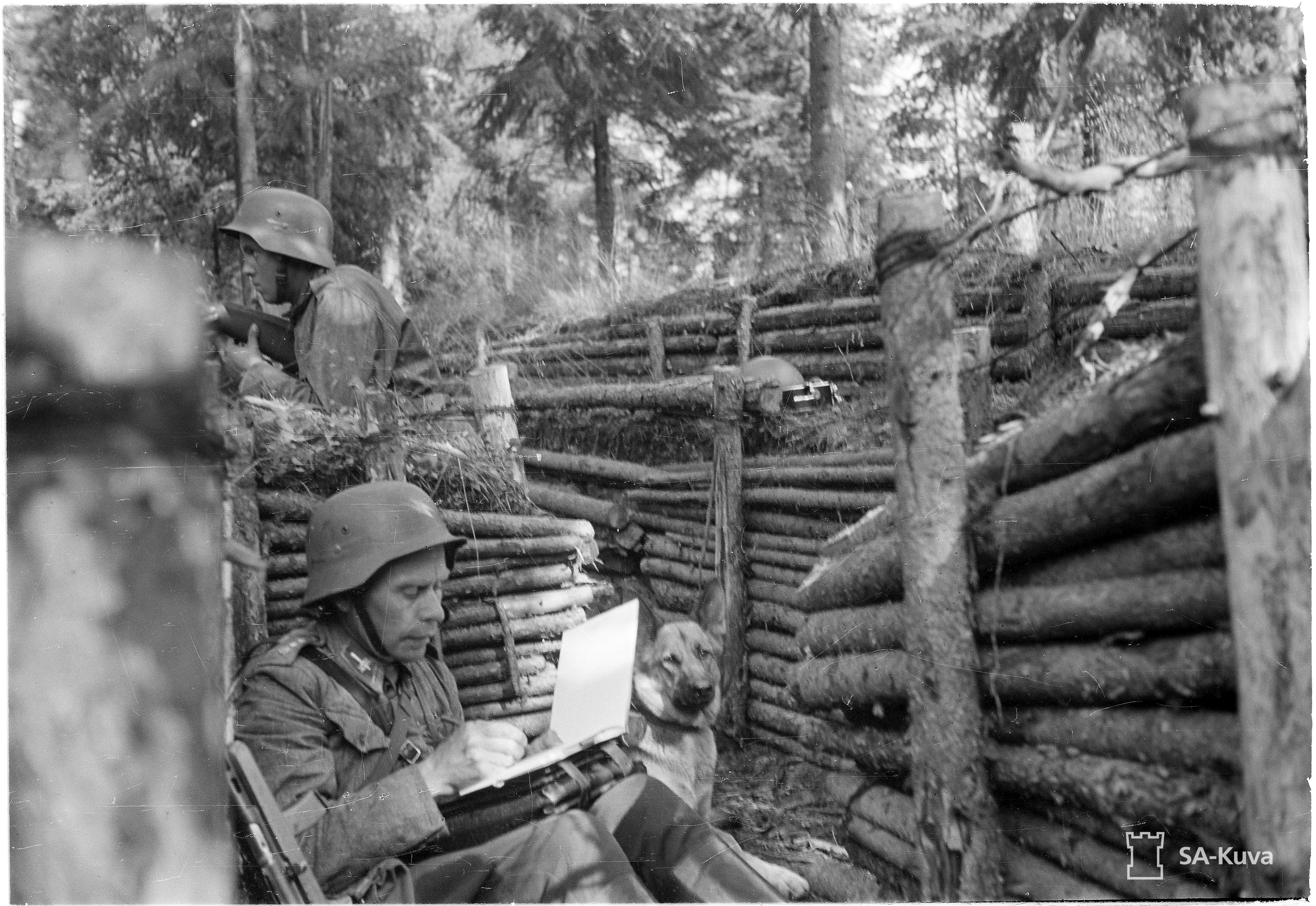
TK artist Aukusti Tuhka drawing a sketch on the frontline.

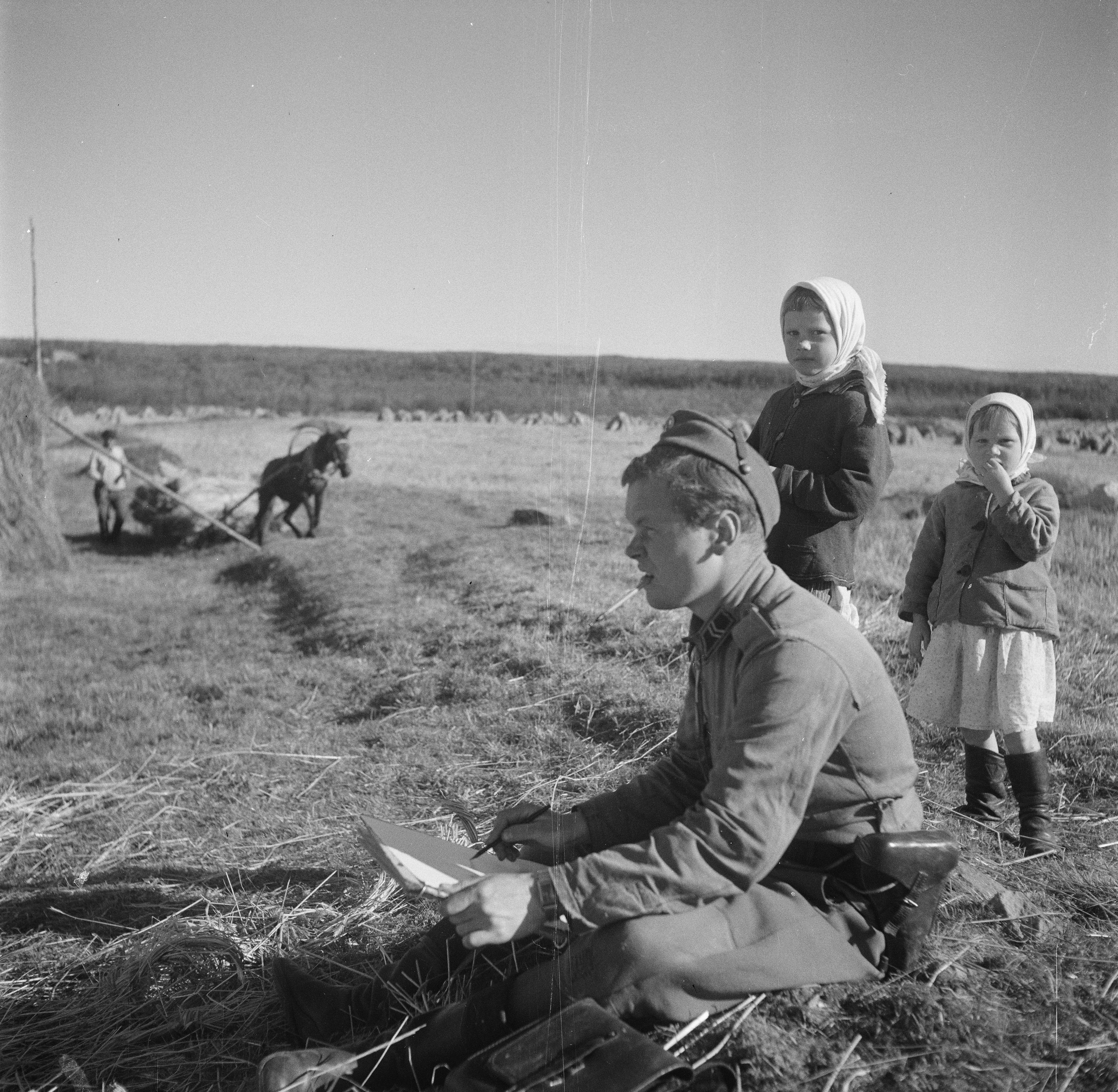
TK artist Erik Enroth drawing Karelian people.

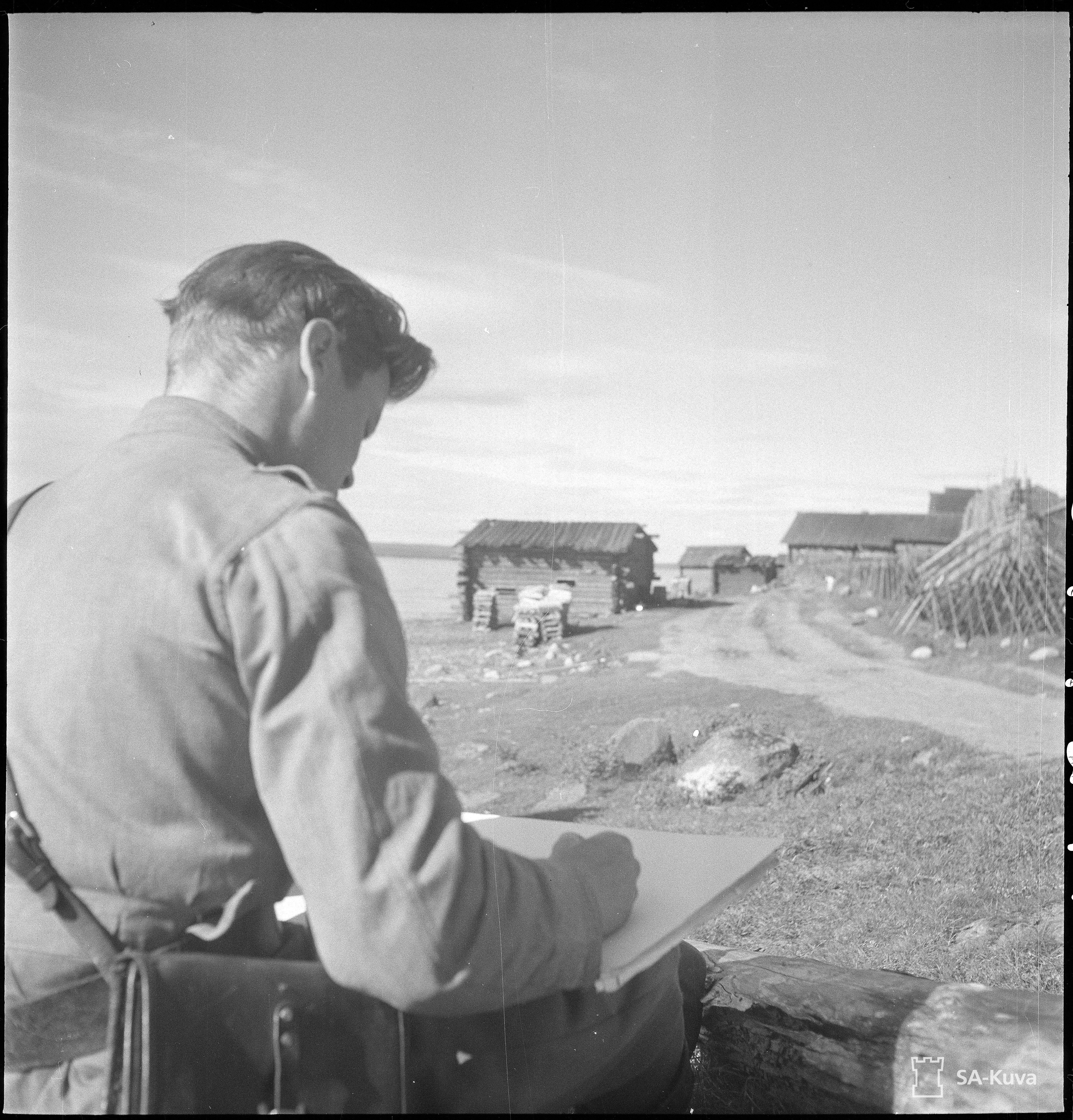
Erik Enroth drawing landscapes of Selkki.

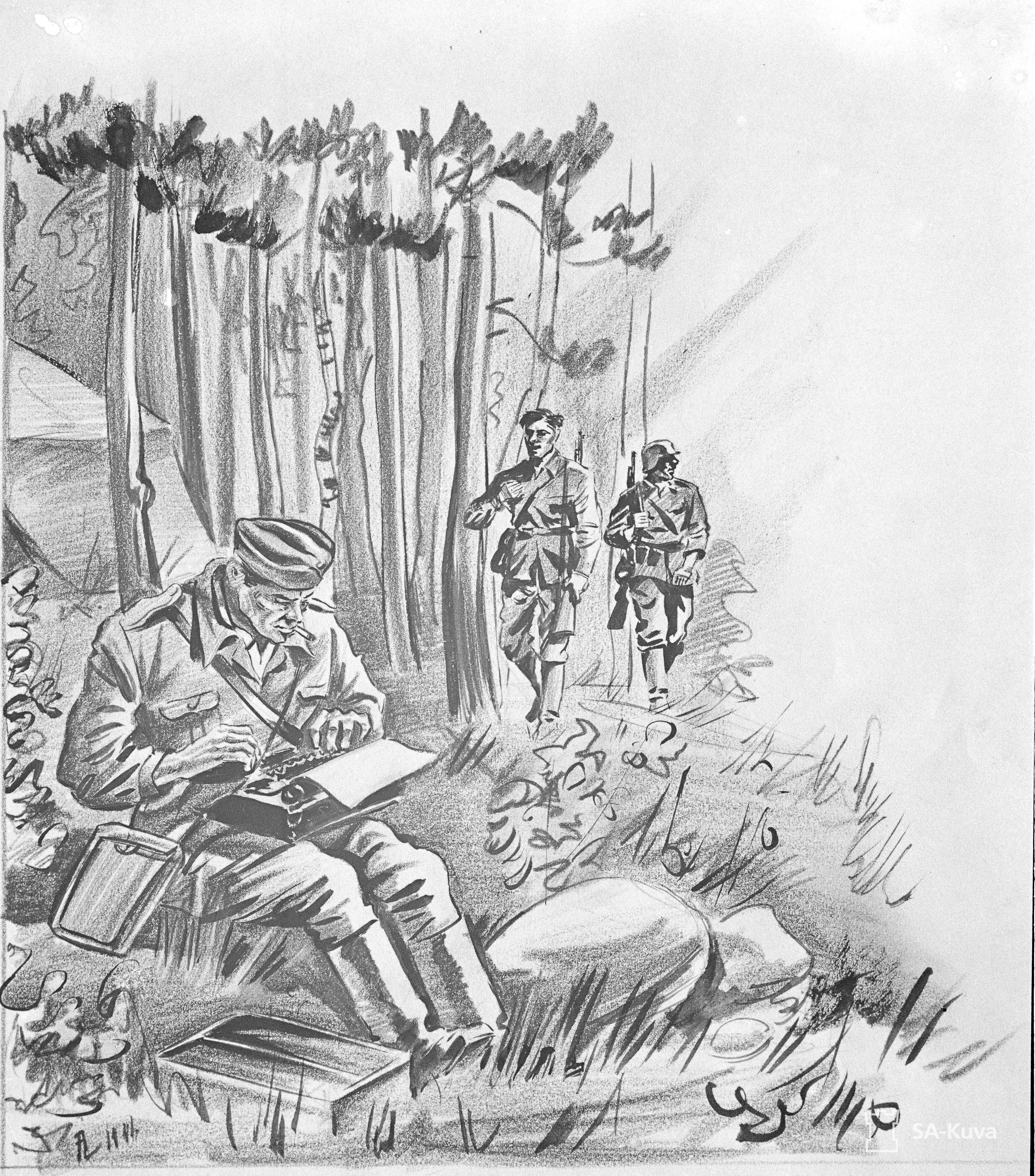
A drawing by TK artists Alexander Lindeberg.

TK artist Kari Suomalainen.

== See also ==
- War correspondent

== Bibliography ==
- Perko, Touko: TK-miehet jatkosodassa: päämajan kotirintaman propaganda 1941–1944. Otava, 1974. ISBN 951-1-01662-8.
- Pilke Helena & Kleemola Olli: Suomi taisteli – Kuvat kertovat. Readme, 2013. ISBN 9789522207685.
- Pilke, Helena: Suomi taiteili: Piirretty sota. Readme, 2015. ISBN 9789523210745.
- Porkka, Reijo: Sodasta kuvin: TK-valokuvaus 1941–1944. Finnish Photography Museum foundation, 1983. ISBN 9519086218.
- Tuomikoski, Pekka: Sensuroidut sotakirjoitukset. Helsinki: Otava, 2013. ISBN 978-951-1-26935-9.
- Kulju, Mika & Tuomikoski, Pekka: Tuntematon jatkosota: TK-miesten sensuroidut dokumentit. Helsinki: Gummerus, 2015. ISBN 978-951-24-0084-3.
