= Maaria Eira =

Finnish opera singer and actor (1924–1999)

Saskia D’Onofrio
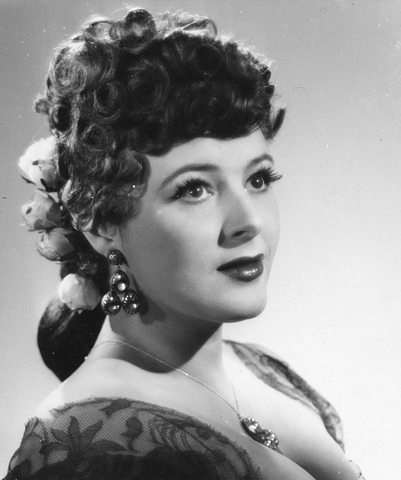
- Saskia D’Onofrio, a.k.a. Maaria Eira, pictured here in the 1940s

Background information
- Also known as: Maaria Eira
- Born: Saskia Marjatta Suomalainen; 23 October 1924; Helsinki, Finland
- Died: 19 June 1999 (aged 74) Rome, Italy
- Genres: Opera
- Occupations: Singer, actor

Maaria Eira (real name Saskia D’Onofrio, née Suomalainen; 23 October 1924 – 19 June 1999) was a Finnish operatic soprano and film actress noted for her coloratura voice and stage presence.

== Personal life ==
Saskia Suomalainen was born to an artistic family: her father was the violinist and music critic Yrjö Suomalainen, and her mother the professional dancer Estelle Suomalainen. Her maternal grandfather was the sculptor Emil Wikström. Her older brother was Professori Kari Suomalainen, who became famous as a political caricaturist and cartoonist.

In the early 1950s, she married the Italian doctor Giovanni D'Onofrio, taking his name and settling in his home city of Rome.

== Education ==
She received her initial training at the Ballet of Finland (now the Finnish National Ballet) ballet school at an early age, from 1928 to 1936, with the aim of becoming a dancer like her mother.

Early on, however, she switched to singing, first training in Finland under Olavi Nyberg, furthering her studies from 1948 until 1950 at the Royal Swedish Opera in Stockholm, and from 1950 continuing under the tutelage of the renowned Italian soprano Toti Dal Monte.

== Career ==
=== Singing ===
Eira's debut performance as a singer came in 1942, at the young age of 18, as Gilda in Verdi's Rigoletto.

In 1951, she won the Rome international singing contest, which paved the way for her international career.

Her repertoire comprised leading roles of the 19th-century opera, including Violetta in La traviata, Desdemona in Otello, Margareta in Faust and Leonora in Il trovatore.

=== Film ===
Attracting the attention of the Finnish film industry, Eira was cast in Toivo Särkkä's 1944 film Balladi. She later starred in another three musical films, Hannu Leminen's Kesäillan valssi (1951), Jack Witikka's Mä oksalla ylimmällä (1954) and Leminen's Onnelliset (1954).

=== Directing ===
In 1980, Maaria Eira D'Onofrio began her career as opera director, debuting at the Rome Opera with a production of Strauss' Elektra. She later went on to direct Aida at Macerata (1982) and Lucia di Lammermoor in Bari (1985), followed among others by productions of La bohème and Madama Butterfly. She won the La Triade artistic award for her directorial accomplishments in 1986.
