= Currie =

Currie may refer to:

== People ==
- Currie (surname), people with the surname Currie
- Currie family, a Scottish family also known as Corrie
- Clan Currie, modern descendants of the MacMhuirich bardic family

== Places ==
=== Australia ===
- Curramulka, South Australia, nicknamed "the Currie"
- Currie, Tasmania, the largest settlement on King Island, Australia

=== United Kingdom ===
- Currie, Edinburgh, a village in Scotland

=== United States ===
- Currie, Minnesota, a US city
- Currie, Nevada, an unincorporated community in the United States
- Currie, North Carolina, an unincorporated community in the United States

== Rugby ==
- Currie RFC, a Scottish rugby club
- Currie Cup, South Africa's premier domestic rugby union competition

== See also ==
- Currier, a person who finishes leather, after the tanning
- Corrie (disambiguation)
- Curry (disambiguation)
- Curie (disambiguation)
