= Kari, Tikamgarh =

Kari
- Town
- Location in Madhya Pradesh, India Kari (India)
- Coordinates: 24°50′13″N 78°52′4″E
- Country: India
- State: Madhya Pradesh
- District: Tikamgarh

Population (2001)
  - Total: 8,686

Languages
  - Official: Hindi
- Time zone: UTC+5:30 (IST)
- ISO 3166 code: IN-MP
- Vehicle registration: MP-36

Kari is a town and a nagar panchayat in Tikamgarh district in the Indian state of Madhya Pradesh.

== Demographics ==
As of 2001 India census, Kari had a population of 8686. Males constitute 53% of the population and females 47%. Kari has an average literacy rate of 36%, lower than the national average of 59.5%: male literacy is 47%, and female literacy is 24%. In Kari, 20% of the population is under 6 years of age.
