= Curie =

Curie may refer to:

== People with the surname Curie ==
- Curie family, a French family of distinguished scientists:

Jacques Curie	Pierre Curie	Marie Skłodowska–Curie
Frédéric Joliot-Curie	Irène Joliot-Curie	Ève Curie

- Jacques Curie (1856–1941), French physicist, Pierre's brother
- Pierre Curie (1859–1906), French physicist and Nobel Prize winner, Marie's husband
- Marie Skłodowska–Curie (1867–1934), Polish chemist and physicist, two-time Nobel Prize winner, Pierre's wife
- Irène Joliot-Curie (1897–1956), French physicist and Nobel Prize winner, Pierre and Marie's daughter
- Frédéric Joliot-Curie (1900–1958), French physicist and Nobel Prize winner, Irène's husband
- Ève Curie (1904–2007), French-American journalist and pianist, Pierre and Marie's daughter
- Henry Richardson Labouisse (1904–1987), American diplomat and director of UNICEF, Ève's husband

- Parvine Curie (born 1936) French and Iranian sculptor

== Things and ideas named after the Curie family ==
=== Scientific concepts, inventions and discoveries ===
- Curie (unit) (Ci), unit of radioactivity
- Curie (lunar crater)
- Curie (Martian crater)
- Curie (rocket engine), a liquid-propellant engine designed by Rocket Lab
- Curie temperature, also known as the Curie point
- Curie's law
- Intel Curie, a sub-miniature x86/Quark-based platform for wearable applications
- Curium, a synthetic chemical element with atomic number 96

=== Institutions ===
- Curie Institute (Paris)
- Curie Institute (Warsaw)
- Curie Metropolitan High School, a secondary school in Chicago
- Pierre and Marie Curie University, Paris

=== Military vessels ===
- French submarine Curie (Q 87), a French submarine in the First World War
- French submarine Curie (P67), a French submarine in the Second World War

=== Technology ===
- Curie (microarchitecture)
- CURIE, more loose alternative to URI, mentioned in some W3 standards (e.g. RDFa)

=== Awards ===
- Irène Joliot-Curie Prize, French prize for women in science and technology. Founded in 2001, it is awarded by the Ministry of Higher Education, Research and Innovation, the Airbus Group corporate foundation, the French Academy of Sciences and the Academy of Technologies to reward women for their work in the fields of science and technology
- Prix Joliot-Curie, established by the Société Française de Physique in 1956 to recognise the work of an individual in the field of nuclear or particle physics, awarded on an annual basis

== See also ==
- Currie (disambiguation)
- Curry (disambiguation)
- Cury, a civil parish and village in southwest Cornwall, England
