= Curry, Texas =

Ghost town in Texas, US

Curry
- Ghost town
- Location in Texas
- Coordinates: 32°44′04″N 98°59′15″W
- Country: United States
- State: Texas
- County: Stephens

Curry is a ghost town in Stephens County, Texas, United States.

== History ==
Established in 1881, Curry is named for settler J. C. Curry. Oil was discovered in the 1920s, and the population peaked at 300. The oil dried up by the 1930s, and the town declined. The settlement was later submerged by a man-made lake.
