= Curry Canyon (Utah) =

Coordinates: 39.2735777°N 110.0787581°W

Curry Canyon is a canyon on the eastern edge of Emery County, Utah, United States.

== Description ==
The canyon is a side canyon of Gray Canyon, on the north side of Big Horn Mountain. The mouth of Curry Canyon is on the west bank of the Green River and extends southwest from the Gray Canyon toward Big Horn Mountain.

Curry Canyon was named for a family of criminals who lived and died near that point.

== See also ==
- List of canyons and gorges in Utah
