= Curry, Pennsylvania =

Unincorporated community in Pennsylvania, United States

Coordinates: 40°19′55″N 79°59′08″W

Curry is an unincorporated community in Allegheny County, Pennsylvania, later renamed Broughton.
