= Marcel Martí =

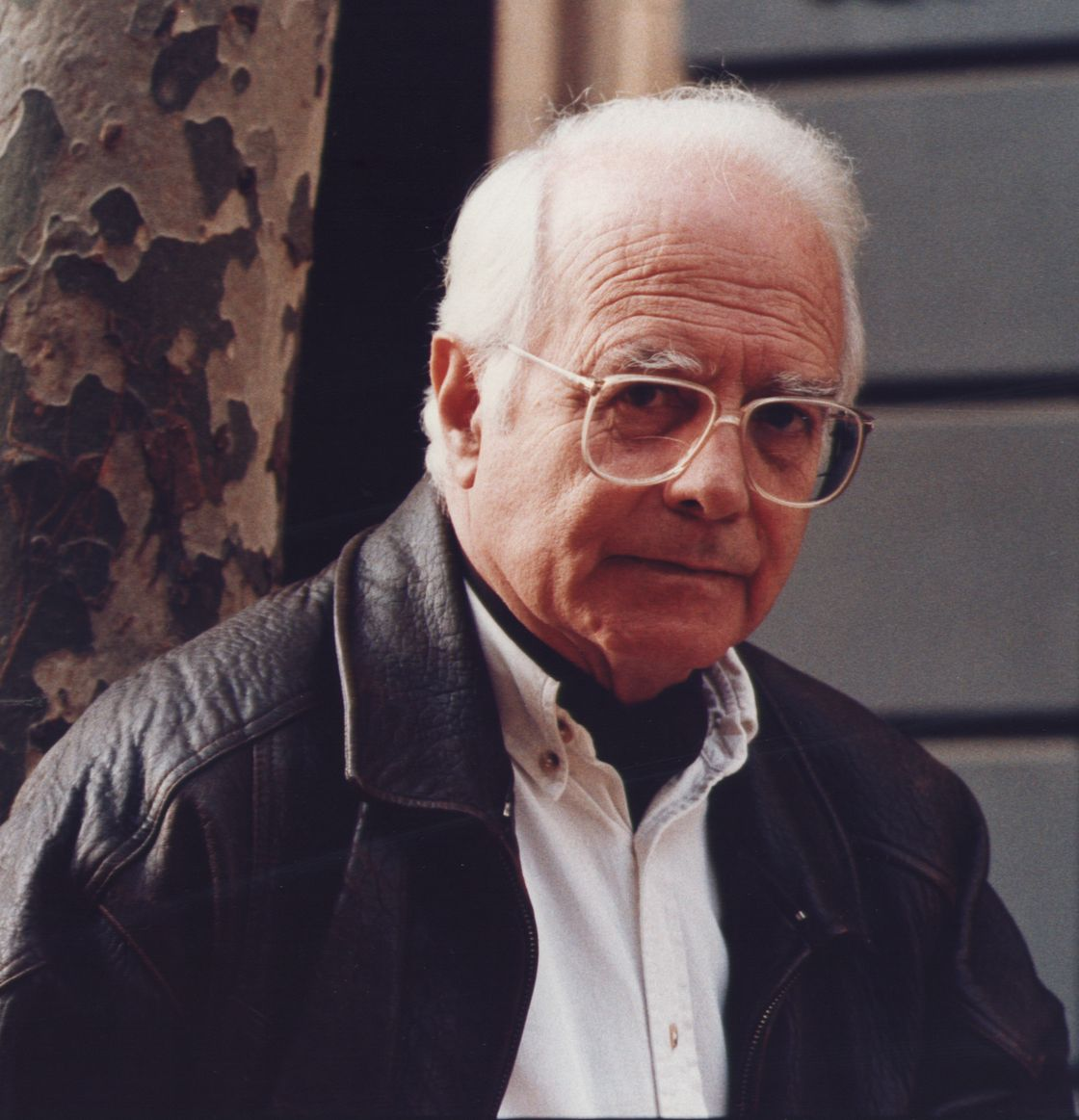
Marcel Martí Photography of A. Orzáez at 1990

Untitled sculpture by Martí, on display at Artesa Vineyards & Winery in Napa Valley, California.

Marcel Martí (1925–2010) was an Argentine-born sculptor of Catalan descent.

== Life and work ==
At the age of three, he returned with his parents to Spain, where the family became established in Barcelona. His father was imprisoned during the Spanish Civil War for activities related to his membership in Acció Catòlica. Martí began to draw by the age of 17, and became interested in sculpture in 1946.

In 1948 he had his first exhibition in Barcelona. By 1953, he devoted himself almost entirely to sculpture. His works have been displayed at exhibitions and museums throughout the Americas, as well as in Spain.

Following a figurative period, most of his work after 1958 tended to the abstract. Martí died at the age of 85 on August 11, 2010, in Catalonia. Between the late-1950s and mid-1970s he had been married to the French-Iranian sculptor Parvine Curie.
