= Aulattivik =

Island in the Qikiqtaaluk Region, Nunavut, Canada

- Location within Nunavut Location within Canada

Geography
- Location: Eclipse Sound
- Coordinates: 72°23′57″N 79°32′23″W
- Archipelago: Arctic Archipelago
- Area: 34 km^{2} (13 sq mi)
- Highest elevation: 700 m (2300 ft)

Administration
- Canada
- Territory: Nunavut
- Region: Qikiqtaaluk

Demographics
- Population: Uninhabited

Aulattivik (Inuktitut syllabics: ᐊᐅᓚᑦᑎᕕᒃ) formerly Curry Island is an irregularly shaped, uninhabited island located in the Qikiqtaaluk Region of Nunavut, Canada. It is located at the mouth of White Bay, off Baffin Island. Eclipse Sound lies to its north.
