= Parvine Curie =

French-Iranian sculptor (born 1936)

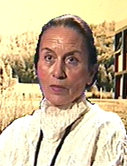
- Curie in 1995
- Born: Parvine Pierson; 3 February 1936 (age 90); Nancy, France
- Known for: Abstract sculpture
- Movement: Abstract
- Spouses: Marcel Martí; François Stahly

Parvine Curie (née Pierson; born 1936), is a French-Iranian abstract sculptor who has exhibited extensively in France and Spain.

== Early life and education ==
Born Parvine Pierson, on 3 February 1936 in Nancy, France, of French-Iranian origin, Curie spent her youth in Troyes, before studying in Bordeaux, and passing her baccalaureate in Paris, where her parents owned a pharmacy. She then began to study languages and left France to visit England, Austria, Spain and Italy. In Barcelona, she discovered Catalan art and decided to settle in that city, where she lived with the sculptor Marcel Martí, with whom she had a son in 1959. During this period, she began to produce sculptures, presenting her first exhibition at the French Institute in Barcelona in 1960. She had received no formal training in art; her knowledge of sculpture being derived largely from her relationship with Martí. By 1965 she was using iron, bronze, cut aluminium and embossed metal.

== Artistic career ==
Curie returned to Paris in 1970, where she established a studio in the Cité internationale des arts. At the Salon de la Jeune Sculpture in the Jardin du Luxembourg, she presented Première Mère (First Mother), an assemblage of glued planks painted black and embellished with brass. This work caught the eye of the sculptor François Stahly, who recognized a strong affinity with his own work of the time. She moved into the studio he shared with his wife, Claude, in Crestet in the Vaucluse département, then later to Meudon, near Paris, where she began to take courses in sculpture. She created Mère Murs (Mother Walls), which initiated a series of Mothers including Mère Citadelle (Mother Citadel) and Mère Croix (Mother Cross). Curie would also spend her summers in Cadaqués in Spain, where the architect, Lanfranco Bombelli, designed a workshop for her.

In 1973, following the death of Claude Stahly, she spent six months with François Stahly in Albany, New York in the US. They travelled to Mexico and Guatemala, where her discovery of Pre-Columbian civilizations was to strongly influence her work. She also travelled to Morocco, India, Egypt, Yugoslavia and Greece, which she would visit frequently to work with the foundryman Theodoros Papadopoulos. After divorcing Marti, she married Stahly and, back in France, received her first public commissions for a sculpture at the Pierre-Bégon college in Blois. This was followed by a hieratic sculpture, Mère Anatolica (Mother Anatolica), placed in the courtyard of the Pierre-de-Coubertin school in Chevreuse, southwest of Paris and Mère-cathédrale, which was purchased by the city of Paris, among other works, for the inauguration of its outdoor sculpture museum.

Subsequent work was inspired by The Pyramids of Giza, by trees and by staircases. Later, she explored new materials for the jewellery that she created. She also produced multiple collages. In 1984 she presented a retrospective at the Museum of Modern Art in Troyes and the city of Meudon commissioned a monument to the victims of Nazi barbarism, made in Carrara marble. In 1988, France bought her aluminium sculpture Mère-Couloirs (Mother corridors) as a gift to German Chancellor Helmut Kohl and two years later the government bought a non-commercial edition of twenty-five small pyramids, which President Mitterrand would offer to heads of state during the 1990 Franco-African summit in La Baule-Escoublac.

Curie presented a retrospective of her works at the Jean Arp Foundation Clamart and at the Centre Jacques Prévert at Aulnay-sous-Bois in 1994. In 1997 her Bell Towers were exhibited in the park of the Château de Fougères, and this was followed by a major retrospective held at the monastery of Pedralbes and the Galerie Maeght in Barcelona in 1999. Between 1972 and 1990 she worked on a permanent installation in the garden of the Meudon Museum. This consisted of a path with thirteen sculptures.

In 2000 she exhibited her works alongside those of her husband at the French Institute in Barcelona. In 2003 she exhibited in Meudon but mainly devoted her time to Stahly who died in 2006. The following year, her son, David Marti, also died. She organized a retrospective for him, presented at the Cadaqués museum in Catalonia in 2009. In 2012 she exhibited a new retrospective in Angers with music and poems written by her son. In 2013 she participated in the exhibition Les Femmes Sculpteurs (Women Sculptors). In 2015, she exhibited in Dessine-moi une collection at the Museum of Modern Art in Troyes. In 2017, at the Camprodon Art Centre in Spain, she presented a retrospective called Sculptures and Thangkas, exhibiting over more than eighty sculptures, drapes, embossed works and collages.

Curie's sculpture Mère-Matmata 1975-1977 formed part of the exhibition of the art of women artists called Elles font l'abstraction. Une autre histoire de l'abstraction au XXe siècle, which was a major exhibition of 20th-century abstract art created by women artists. The exhibition presented more than five hundred works from over one hundred international women artists and was first exhibited in 2021 at the Centre Georges Pompidou in Paris in 2021, and later travelled in a reduced form to the Guggenheim Museum Bilbao in Spain and the West Bund Museum in Shanghai, China.

== Awards and honours ==
In 1976 the Monnaie de Paris, the French Mint, published small reliefs, sculptures and her jewelry in limited editions. In 1979, Curie received the Prix Bourdelle, with the selection being made by other sculptors. In 2013, she was made a Chevalier of the Ordre des Arts et des Lettres, being elevated to the rank of Officer of that Order in 2021.

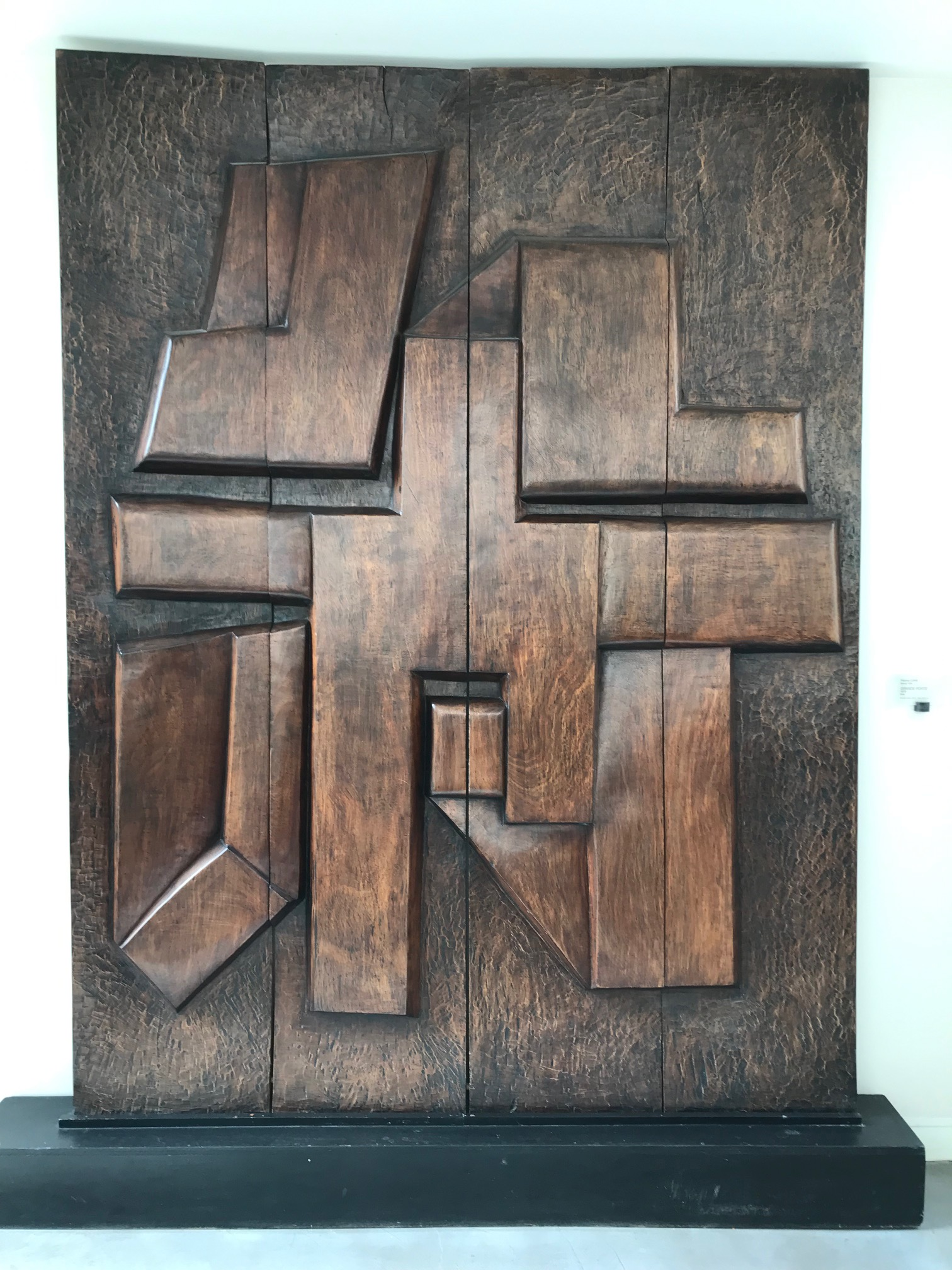
Grande porte, 1979

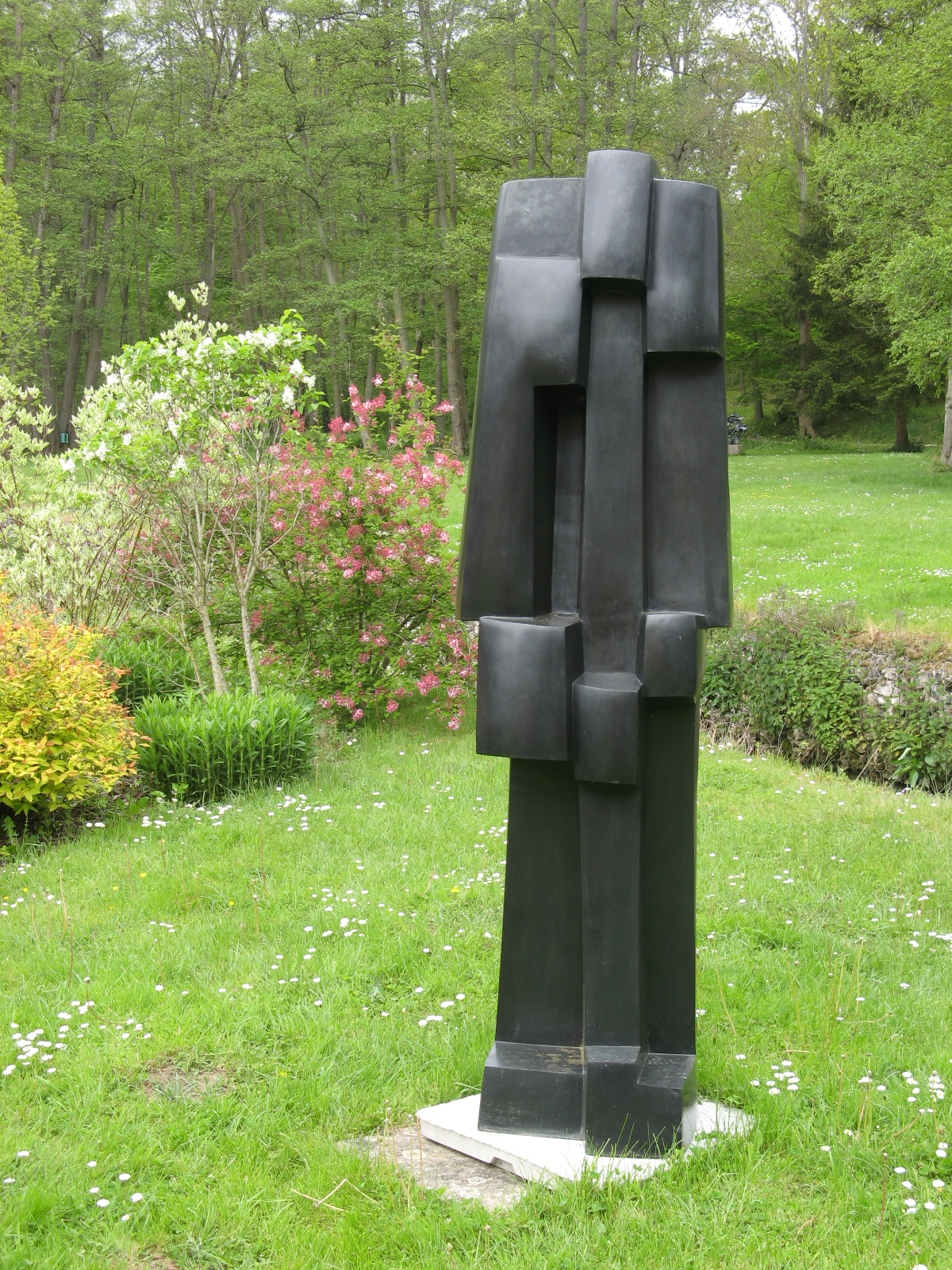
Le Voyageur

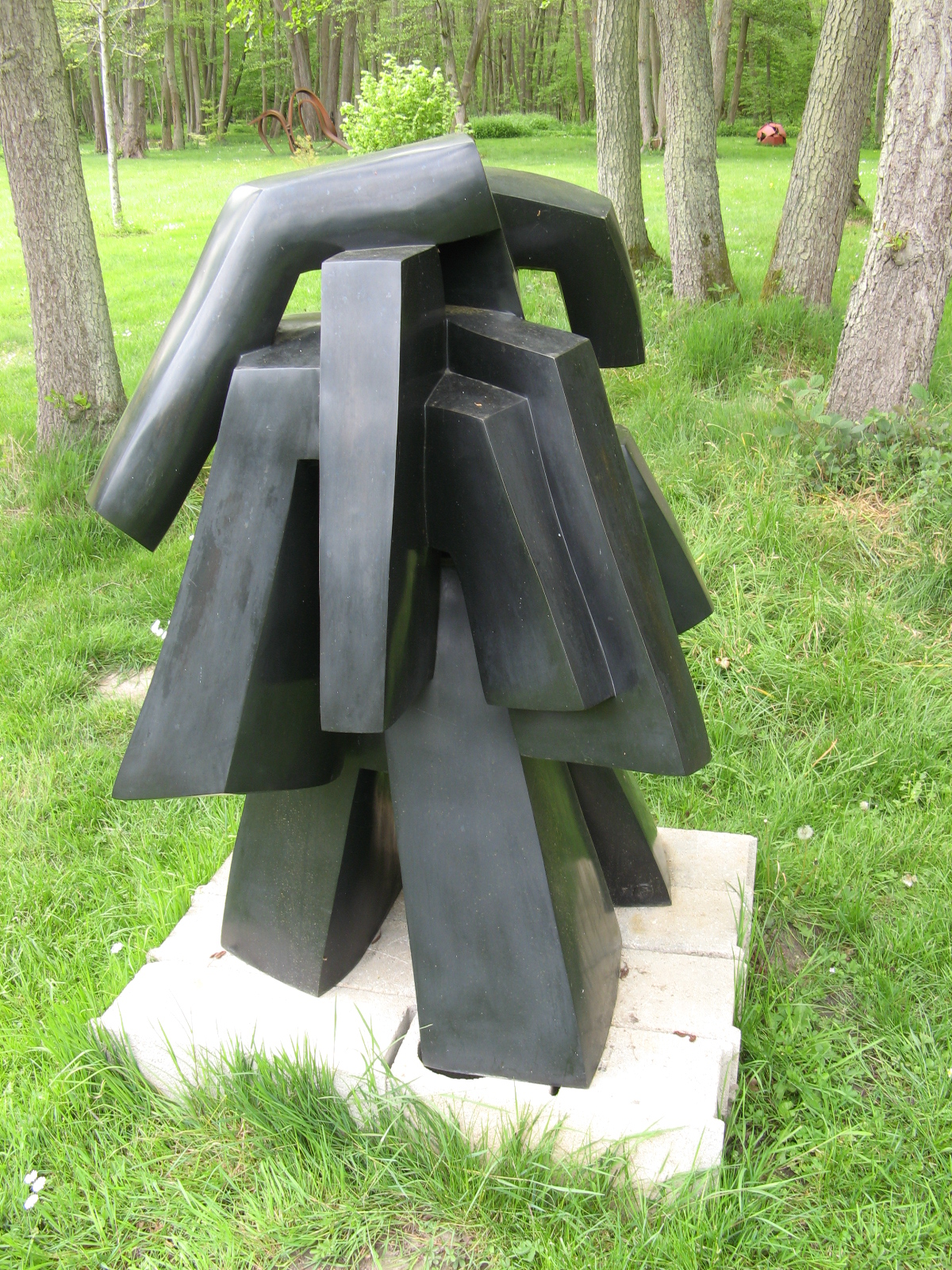
Arbre Shivesque
