= Kari (music) =

Kari, in shakuhachi music, is both a property of a note and a technique. To play a note kari means to play it with raised pitch, relative to playing the note meri. In addition to sharpening the pitch, playing a note kari also modifies the tone color or timbre of a note.

The usual technique to play a note kari is to raise the chin, increasing the angle and distance between the embouchure and utaguchi (blowing edge).
