= Curry (surname) =

Origin
- Region of origin: British Isles

Other names
- Variant forms: Currey; Currie; Corry; MacMhuirrich; MacVurich

Curry is a common surname used in Ireland, Scotland and England. Currey is a less common variant. In England and Scotland, is it thought to derive from local place names and, in Scotland, also possibly from MacMhuirrich.

== Forms of the name ==
In some cases the surname is an Anglicised form of the Irish Ó Comhraidhe; the "h" lenites the preceding consonant, so the Anglicised form is not far from the pronunciation in Irish. It sometimes takes the form Corry or Corra, especially in the northern counties, where in the few early records in which the name is found the prefix 'Mac' is usually substituted for 'O'. Corry, however, may also have other origins which will be mentioned later.

In Scotland the surname was originally Gaelic MacMhuirich however with the Highland clearances, many Gaelic names were Anglicised so the surnames took the form of something that sounded similar. MacMhuirich took variations such as MacVurich, Currie, Curry and Currey.

== Origins ==
The most numerous and well-known sept of Ó Comhraidhe is that of Thomond with their centre in County Clare. There was a little-known sept of O'Curry in the barony of Kerrycurrihy in County Cork, where the name is now often found as Corry. This Cork sept may have been a branch of the main Thomond sept. They are recorded as a sept of Corca Laoighe and the name is found also in Kerry, presumably as a result of migration. In addition to the main sept of Ó Comhraidhe another of the same name was located in County Westmeath, where they were Chiefs of Moygoish. Curristown, to which they gave their name, (now known as Belmont) is testimony to their power and significance in that area.

In Ulster, many of the name Curry are of Scottish ancestry. There is a rule of thumb that says Currie is Scottish while Curry is Irish in origin, but the spellings have been so interchanged that the rule counts for little. In Scotland Currie can be a variant of Corrie. It can also be an Anglicised form of the Gaelic MacMhuirich, 'son of Murdoch'. One family of this surname, Clann MacMhuirich, was produced hereditary bards to chiefs of Clan Donald and Clan MacDonald of Clanranald, and claim descent from the thirteenth-century Irish poet Muireach Alhanach.

In mid-nineteenth-century Antrim the main concentration of the name was found to be to the north of Ballymoney in the barony of Carey. In a final twist to the history of the name in Scotland, many Curries of Arran, Kintyre and the Isles were originally MacCurdys

The name Corry is usually Ó Corraidh (or Ó Corra) and in modern times is often abbreviated to Corr. However, when found in Clare, it is probably a variant form of Ó Comhraidhe - O'Curry and as we have seen already, Corry is a known variant of Curry in Cork.

In Ulster, the names Corr, Corry and Curry are numerous. There they can be of more than one origin. The majority no doubt are Ó Corra, descended from the sept of that name located in the Tyrone-Fermanagh country and numerous in central Ulster in the seventeenth century as the Hearth Money Rolls show.

Many of the Corrs of Tyrone and Londonderry are, however, descended from the Gilla Corr, mentioned in the Annals of Ulster (1186), whose son is perpetuated in the townland of Ballykilcurr, near Maghera. One of the Anglicised forms of Mac Gothraidh - a branch of the MacGuires of Fermanagh, and most usually found as McCaffrey - is MacCorry, often without the prefix Mac; others are MacCorry and Godfrey. Mac Corra, too, has been noted in Ulster but this is possibly a modem form of Mac Gothraidh. Both O'Cor and MacCor occur in the Armagh Hearth Money Rolls, O'Cor being the more numerous there.

The prevalence of the name Corry in Counties Waterford and south Tipperary in the seventeenth century might suggest that some of the O'Currys of Thomond migrated but this theory is not borne out by numerous mediaeval records which show that people called Cor and Corre were established in Counties Tipperary and Kilkenny as early as 1270 (Richard Corre was Bishop of Lismore from 1279 to 1308): this may well be an unidentified Norman name unrelated to Curry, for migration from Thomond to Ormond was unusual, though not unknown, before the fourteenth century. However, in the mid 17th century at the time of Oliver Cromwell's campaign in Ireland, one of the major landowners in south Tipperary (Clonmel) was a John Corr of Toberhanny. He is said to be descended from a Norman family Corre, that came to Ireland in 1171 at Crooke, County Waterford with King Henry II of England, alongside Theobald FitzWalter, later to become Butler, Earl of Ormonde. In 1650 John Corr and 141 retainers were given the option 'To Hell or to Connaught', In other words, either be transplanted to Connaught or face death and eternity in hell. It is said that John Corr was a close ally of the Butler's of Ormonde. When he was dispossessed of his lands he sought refuge with the Ormondes. When Ormonde regained control of his lands he rewarded John Corr with grants of land for his allegiance. Instead of lands at Toberhanny, he was given land at Cuffesgrange, County Kilkenny. (previously known as Comerford's Grange). The family remain here to this day. This family is the same family of Frank J. Corr who became mayor of Chicago.

== People ==
- Aaron Curry (American football) (born 1986), American college football coach and former National Football League player
- Aaron Curry (artist) (born 1972), American painter
- Aaron Curry (politician) (1887–1957), English Member of Parliament
- Adam Curry (born 1964), American podcaster and video jockey
- Adrianne Curry (born 1982), American model and reality TV personality
- Aidan Curry (born 2002), American baseball player
- Andrew Currey (born 1971), Australian javelin thrower
- Ann Curry (born 1956), American news anchor on NBC's Today Show and host of Dateline NBC
- Anne Curry (born 1954), English historian
- Ayesha Curry (born 1989), Canadian-American actress, celebrity cook, cookbook author, and television personality
- Bill Curry (born 1942), American National Football League player and college football coach
- Brownlee O. Currey Jr. (1928–2020), American businessman
- Bruce Curry (born 1956), American former boxer, WBC Super Lightweight champion from 1983 to 1984
- Caden Curry (born 2003), American football player
- Catherine Curry-Williams, American non-profit founder
- Chris Curry (baseball) (born 1977), American college baseball coach and former catcher
- Chris Curry, pen name of Tamara Thorne (born 1957), American horror writer
- Christopher Curry (actor) (born Christopher Root in 1948), American actor
- Christopher Curry (businessman) (born 1946), British co-founder of Acorn Computers
- Clifford Curry (1936–2016), American singer
- Dan Curry, American set designer and visual effects producer
- Dave Currey (American football) (born 1943), American college athletics administrator and former football player and coach
- Dave Currey (environmentalist) (born 1953), British environmentalist, photographer and writer
- David Curry (born 1944), British Member of Parliament from 1987 to 2010
- Dayna Curry (born 1971), American who was held prisoner in Afghanistan by the Taliban in 2001
- Declan Curry (born 1971), Northern Irish journalist and presenter for the BBC
- Dell Curry (born 1964), American basketball player and father of current basketball players Stephen and Seth Curry
- DeMarcus Curry (born 1975), American former football player
- Denise Curry (born 1979), American basketball player and coach
- Denzel Curry (born 1995), American rapper
- Derek Curry (born 1981), American former football player
- Don Curry (born 1959), American actor and stand-up comedian
- Donald Curry (born Donald Sample in 1961), American boxer
- Eddy Curry (born 1982), American former National Basketball Association player
- Esmé Currey (1881–1973), British artist
- Eugene O'Curry (1794–1862), Irish scholar and translator
- Floyd Curry (1925–2006), Canadian former National Hockey League player
- Frances Currey (1925–2012), American painter
- Francis S. Currey (1925–2019), American soldier and recipient of the Congressional Medal of Honor
- George E. Curry (1947–2016), African-American journalist and columnist
- George Curry (politician) (1861–1947), American politician and former governor of New Mexico Territory
- George Curry (Wild Bunch) (1871–1900), Canadian-American Old West robber
- Harold Curry (1932–2022), American politician and lawyer
- Haskell Curry (1900–1982), American mathematician and logician
- Izola Curry (1916–2015), African-American who tried to assassinate Martin Luther King Jr.
- Jabez L. M. Curry (1825–1903), American lawyer, soldier and Congressman
- Jack Curry (born 1964), American sports analyst and former New York Times baseball correspondent
- Jane Louise Curry (born 1932), American author
- Jeffrey Currey, American politician
- Jesse Curry (1913–1980), chief of the Dallas police when John F. Kennedy was assassinated there
- John Curry (disambiguation)
- Joseph T. Curry (1895–1961), American cotton planter, member of the Louisiana House of Representatives (1930–1944)
- Judith Curry, American climate scientist
- Julian Curry (1937–2020), English actor
- Julie Curry (born 1962), American politician
- Lawrence Curry (1935–2018), American educator and politician
- Lisa Curry (born 1962), Australian swimmer and reality TV contestant
- Manfred Curry (1899–1953), German-American who improved the science of sailboat design
- Margaret L. Curry (1898–1986), American state parole officer
- Mark Curry (disambiguation)
- Melody Currey, American politician
- Michael Curry (disambiguation)
- Mickey Curry (born 1956), American rock drummer
- Norman Curry (1946–2022), Namibian cricketer
- Olivia Curry (born 1989), American boxer
- Paul Curry (1917–1986), American vice-president of the Blue Cross Insurance Company of New York and amateur magician
- Richard Owen Currey (1816–1865), American university professor, physician and Presbyterian minister
- Robert Brownlee Currey (1774–1848), American politician
- Robert Henry Curry (1885–1930), murderer in the 1930 Palm Island tragedy, Queensland, Australia
- Ronald Curry (born 1979), American National Football League assistant coach and former player
- Rube Curry (1898–1966), American Negro league baseball pitcher and manager
- Sean Curry (born 1982), American ice hockey player
- Sedrick Curry (born 1976), American football player
- Seth Curry (born 1990), American basketball player
- Shaun Curry (1937–2009), British actor
- Shirley Curry (born 1936), American YouTuber and gamer
- Sonya Curry (born 1966), American educator and mother of basketball players Steph and Seth Curry
- Stephen Curry (born 1988), American basketball player
- Stephen Curry (comedian) (born 1976), Australian comedian and actor
- Steve Curry (born 1965), American Major League Baseball pitcher in July 1988
- Susie Curry (born 1972), American professional fitness competitor
- Thomas John Curry (born 1943), Irish-born American Catholic Auxiliary Bishop Emeritus
- Tim Curry (1946–2026), British actor
- Tom Curry (footballer) (1894–1958), British footballer and trainer
- Tyler Curry (born 1983), American LGBT activist and columnist
- Valorie Curry (born 1986), American actress
- Wayne K. Curry (1951–2014), American politician
- Wes Curry (1860–1933), American Major League Baseball pitcher and umpire
- William Currey (1895–1948), Australian First World War recipient of the Victoria Cross and politician
- Xzavion Curry (born 1998), American baseball player

== Fictional characters ==
- Arthur Curry, secret identity of DC Comic character Aquaman
- Bruce Curry, mercenary leader in the 1968 film Dark of the Sun and Wilbur Smith's novel on which the film was based
- Jedidiah "Kid" Curry, a main character of the Western TV series Alias Smith and Jones
- Tom Curry and Orm Curry, father and half-brother, respectively, of Aquaman
- Mr. Curry, recurring character in the Paddington Bear series

== See also ==
- General Curry (disambiguation)
- Governor Curry (disambiguation)
- Senator Curry (disambiguation)
- Carry (name)
- Currie (surname)
- Curry (disambiguation)
