= Gary Hodges =

British artist and publisher

Gary Hodges with Virginia McKenna (L) and Rula Lenska (R) at his major retrospective show Drawn to the Soul at the Nature in Art museum, September 2010.

Gary Hodges (born 1954) is a British artist and publisher much admired internationally for his graphite pencil wildlife art. His original drawings and limited edition prints have sold widely in the UK and throughout the world and is collected by large numbers of ordinary citizens, many not previously seeing themselves as "art collectors". During his career he has sold over 110,000 limited edition prints from 130 editions. His popularity has influenced and encouraged many other artists to develop intricate styles with pencil. He has a close connection to various environmental and wildlife conservation groups for whom he provides considerable financial support.

== Early life and influences ==
Born in South London in 1954 he is the son of a fishmonger and secretary. Surrounded by pets as a child he grew up with a strong passion for animals and was given wildlife books which gave him considerable knowledge of many different species. He was also influenced by his love of comics such as X Men and Spiderman and at school he was encouraged to pursue his love of art, especially drawing. During this time his mother fell ill and died. He gained "O" level qualifications early but went on to unsuccessfully study for "A" levels and left school at the age of sixteen for a job in the printing trade.

In 1978 he met his civil partner, professional photographer and environmentalist Dave Currey. This introduced him to the world of conservation and environmental activism. In early 1980 he left his printing job and they travelled to the western US and Mexico, where they saw wildlife such as whales, sealions, ospreys, and dolphins. It was his first real experience of wilderness.

In 1981 and 1982 he was commissioned to illustrate two articles in Wildlife Magazine. He picked up other work to design a leaflet and illustrate many press releases for WWF. His drawings were exhibited at the Hampstead Open Air Exhibition in 1981 and the Henry-Brett Galleries in Chelsea, London and Gloucester in 1982. By this time he started working with children in Brixton, south London, moving to run and help build an adventure playground in Elephant and Castle, a deprived area of south London. In 1983 his drawings were highly commended at the Wildlife Illustrator of the Year Exhibition at the Natural History Museum, London and he had his first solo show at the Everyman Foyer Gallery, Hampstead in 1984.

In 1987 Greenpeace commissioned the first two of nine limited edition prints over the next few years. His father was diagnosed with cancer and died in 1988, a loss which caused him to re-evaluate his life. The huge sell-out success of the first Greenpeace editions encouraged him to concentrate on his art.

== Wildlife drawings 1987–1994 ==
After visiting many potential art and book publishers in the 1980s Hodges could have been dismayed by their dismissal, stating that "black & white doesn't sell." Some encouraged him to work in colour. However, the huge success of the first five Greenpeace limited edition prints, selling out editions of 850 prints, helped him decide to publish himself. This was very uncommon at the time.

Hodges has described his technique to the public while artist in residence at the prestigious Nature in Art museum in Gloucester, UK over many years. He has also provided access to his drawing through time-lapse photography in two of the films made about him and in magazines. He uses a range of graphite pencils from grade 8H to 5B, a scalpel knife for sharpening the pencils, trimming paper and creating a bevel on plastic erasers which he uses to bring out highlights. His references have usually been his own photographs, and in more recent years largely taken from the wild. He has expressed real concern over conditions and the ethics of zoos. A drawing may take him many months, with them taking longer in more recent years. He draws on Fabriano 5 paper, also reproducing images as limited editions on the same paper to maintain quality.

His early Greenpeace drawings of Green Turtle (1987) and Narwhal (1987) have become collector's pieces with the prints first selling for £8.50, more recently the Green turtle exchanging hands for £3,500.00 on the secondary art market (the resale of art following its original acquisition from the artist). During this time Snow Leopard (1993) became his fastest selling print (edition of 850), although this has since been surpassed. Its scarcity created a secondary demand with it selling for around £3,000 many times and has reached £3,200. The investment potential of his prints has attracted additional collectors to his following.

He became fairly prolific in this period exhibiting at various shows including the Medici Gallery, London, the Mall Galleries, London and the Robin des Bois Gallery, Paris – all in 1989.

=== Born Free ===
Hodges first met the stars of the iconic movie Born Free, Virginia McKenna and the late Bill Travers, in 1989 at the Society of Wildlife Artists' annual exhibition in London. He states that he was "a little overwhelmed and shocked when they wanted to buy my Eléphants Africains drawing." McKenna and Travers had set up Zoocheck (later to be known as Born Free Foundation) to press for closure of zoos.

Soon after this meeting, George Adamson, the true-life character in Born Free, was murdered in Kenya. Hodges received a call from McKenna asking him to accept a commission to draw Adamson in time for a memorial service in London. Working from old videos and photographs Hodges created George Adamson with Boy and Christian (1989), Adamson's favourite lions. Virginia Mckenna loved the drawing and Hodges stated this gave him greater confidence as an artist.

Hodges and McKenna have remained friends with Hodges supporting the Born Free Foundation for many years. McKenna said of the drawing "A picture of love and trust. Lord of the Lions George Adamson with Boy and Christian. The living spirit of the animals shines through their eyes and the beauty of their physical presence leaps from the paper. An artist who understands."

=== Fast Frame franchise ===
Virginia McKenna's secretary took a limited edition print of George Adamson with Boy and Christian into a framing shop in Croydon, Surrey. The owner of the shop was so impressed with Hodges' art he asked to stock the prints in 1990. It turned out that this shop was part of the Fast Frame franchise and when the prints sold really well Croydon contacted the other Fast Frame shops around the UK. Before long his limited edition prints were being sold in around 75 framing shops.

Hodges was already being recognised for his art winning the WWF Fine Art Prize at the Society of Wildlife Artists' annual shows in 1989 and 1990. In 1991 he held a highly successful solo show in the Medici Gallery in central London and his prints were being sold in charity shows as well as all the retail outlets.

In 1992 he drew Bengal Tigress and Cub especially for the UK televised charity appeal ITV Telethon, prints of which were sold through the Fast Frame franchise. These prints, the first ever for this television charity, raised about £20,000. Soon after this the franchise went into liquidation and Hodges built individual relationships with the remaining shops.

=== Mall Galleries, solo show 1994 ===
With his popularity growing, Hodges decided to stage a solo show of his work at the Mall Galleries in central London. This very large space is used for many different group art shows and is centrally positioned on the Mall next to the ICA, near Trafalgar Square and Buckingham Palace.

Already associated with two wildlife groups – Born Free Foundation and the Environmental Investigation Agency (EIA) (his partner Dave Currey a founding director) – he decided to donate the proceeds to these two organisations to aid their work. The show took place from 24 November – 5 December 1994. At the private view the queue to enter tailed down the Mall and inside there was a constant line of people trying to buy originals and limited editions prints. The event was on local television, an auction was held, and a number of notable UK celebrities actively involved themselves in helping and buying his art. It was described by the gallery as the first time they had seen so many people at a solo show.

The show was a complete sell-out. All 21 originals and over 900 limited editions prints sold and raised £90,000 for the two organisations. Although Hodges was already well established, after this huge success his prints became more in demand, editions sold out in weeks and secondary art market prices increased.

== Wildlife drawings 1995–present ==
His success provided Hodges with the means to research his subjects in the wild more than ever. He had always felt uncomfortable using photographic references taken from zoos because of his opposition to the captivity of wildlife, although in some cases they remained his only source. But from 1990 he first visited East Africa and later many other countries.

In late 1995 his pet border collie died and he went back to an older drawing (1986) he had completed of Jaff and worked on it more. This was to become quite common for him in the following years – updating older pictures before releasing them as prints. The limited edition print Jaff (1995) was released in December 1995 and he and his partner decided to sell the prints for charity. It raised about £34,000 which went towards feeding starving working elephants in Kaziranga National Park, India, an orang-utan research project in Borneo and a tiger campaign.

This was a very difficult time for Hodges as his and his partner's friend Paul Delapenha fell very sick. In 1996 Hodges spent time with Delapenha and his family in Jamaica before they returned to the UK where he died. Hodges was unable to draw and in early 1997 he and his partner moved out of London to Wiltshire in the English countryside.

Although throughout this period Hodges was much less prolific than in his earlier years, he spent a lot of time updating older drawings and releasing them as limited edition signed prints. When in 1997, following his friend's death, Hodges drew Supreme (1997), a Siberian tiger, it was to become his largest edition size of 1,950, selling out before being issued. The drawing was dedicated to his friend Paul Delapenha and named Supreme because of Delapenha's love of the motown group The Supremes. The original was sold at Christie's Auction House London in 1998 for £16,215. His originals have continued to sell for high prices at auction. The head of wildlife art at Christie's, Fiona Osbourne-Young, said of Hodges art "Everything is perfection ... to get this from a pencil leads pencil drawing into a completely different dimension."

Between 1996 and 2003 he achieved incredible limited edition print sales and was recipient of a number of awards. Many of his prints were sold to retailers "on allocation" – only providing a percentage of their requirements. This no doubt added to his collectability.

Slowly starting to draw again, Hodges completed a tiger drawing Pride and Joy (1998) and started on Nile Crocodile (unfinished) (2000). The crocodile drawing was featured in a film documentary "Drawn to Wildlife" in time lapse photography, showing the painstaking detail and technique of Hodges as an artist. It was also released unfinished as a limited edition print (1,500 copies) and over subscribed. The launch event supported by Cygnet's gallery raised £24,000 for the Born Free Foundation.

In 1998 Hodges joined his partner Currey in Indonesia, where he was working to protect orang-utans and stop illegal logging. They travelled through Tanjung Puting National Park in Borneo which was (at the time) being heavily illegally logged, met with primatologist Birute Galdikas who has worked with orang-utans for decades, and interacted with rehabilitated orang-utans. During this trip footage for the documentary "Drawn to Wildlife" was shot by Currey of Hodges in the field. Hodges states this trip had "an incredibly powerful effect" on him and it resulted in a new drawing Plea for the Rainforest (1999) – an evocative portrait of a baby orang-utan peering over its mother's head who is pleading to the viewer. Time lapse photography of this drawing was shown on National Geographic TV in "Wild Vision" in 1999.

His last drawing completed in the UK was Serenity (2001) a clouded leopard. In 2000 he and his partner moved to Spain, although keeping a base in the UK. Serenity was reproduced as Hodges' 100th limited edition print (1,750 copies).

In 2002 one of the public's favourite drawings, Sabu (2002), a snow leopard, was the first drawing to be completed in his Ibiza home. The print edition sold out before release and Hodges states it hangs in 1,300 homes, including some of his celebrity collectors such as Martina Navratilova, Kiki Dee, Pam St Clement and Rula Lenska.

Working with the same film producer that had made "Drawn to Wildlife" in 1998, David Felber, Hodges travelled to Kenya with actress and friend Rula Lenska to make a new DVD based around his drawing of elephants. They visited Daphne Sheldrick and her orphaned elephants in both Nairobi and Tsavo East National Park and Tsavo West National Park and filmed their interactions with these elephants. This was a return visit to meet Sheldrick for both Hodges and Lenska. On return to Ibiza, Hodges drew, again filmed in time lapse for the "Wild at Art" DVD, Joy (2003) of young African elephants running towards a waterhole.

In 2004 and 2005 Hodges created three new drawings linked to charity. Little Foxes (2004) resulted from a visit to Wildlife Aid, a British charity made famous on the TV show Wildlife SOS featuring Wildlife Aid founder Simon Cowell. Queen of Diamonds (2004), a green turtle, was his contribution to a set of transformation playing cards in aid of the Marine Stewardship Council. Other artist contributors included Damian Hurst, Quentin Blake, and Dame Elizabeth Blackadder. The Born Free Foundation contacted Hodges in the autumn of 2004 asking him to draw Elsa the lioness to celebrate their 21st anniversary as a charity. The Spirit of Elsa (2005) was the result, drawn from old grainy photographs of Elsa, a lioness which had died when Hodges was a child. He states that he listened to Matt Monro's version of the theme tune of "Born Free" playing in the background on repeat, sometimes changing it to Kiki Dee's acoustic version. He believes the drawing has "a touch of innocent, child-like quality to it." This was Hodges' first drawing he reproduced on canvas as well as paper.

One of Hodges' personal favourites is his drawing of a family of meerkats Family (2005) which he states represents a new group of friends from many nationalities he and his partner made in Ibiza to add to his old friends in the UK and elsewhere. Angel Eyes (2005) was dedicated to his stepmother Ann who died in October of that year.

Still very popular Hodges has managed to maintain a loyal following over the years. Soulmates (2007), a drawing of snow leopards sold for £16,500 at the Society of Wildlife Artists' annual show in 2007 also winning the 2007 Visitors' Award out of over 400 exhibits. The limited edition print sold out completely. In recent years he has concentrated on a series of wild cat portraits starting with a tiger, Majesty (2009), followed by a cheetah, Grace (2009) and then in 2010 he released a limited edition print of an unfinished part of his next cat portrait which he called Fire (2010) – a jaguar. The finished drawing was completed 2011. Hodges has recently published three limited edition prints printed by the giclee process including The Incredible Journey, newly hatched loggerhead turtles running for the sea.

In 2015, in preparation for a major solo show at the Mall Galleries in central London, Hodges has embellished around 40 collectable limited edition prints. He has worked on the prints with pencil to make each print unique. They will go on show at "Heart & Soul The Exhibition" along with originals and prints in April 2016.

His contribution to art was recognised in September 2010 by Nature in Art, the world's first museum dedicated to art inspired by nature. Two of their five galleries were used for a five-week major retrospective show of his art called "Drawn to the Soul" with forty-five Hodges' originals on display. His book of the same title was published to coincide with this show.

In 2013 Hodges was recognised in a show at Nature in Art "Wildlife Masters" where he was the only pencil artist exhibited with painters David Shepherd, Simon Combes, Anthony Gibbs and sculptor Geoffrey Dashwood.

== Travel for references ==
Since early success Hodges has travelled extensively for inspiration and references. He has visited East Africa on many occasions with notable elephant drawings, big cats other African wildlife gaining inspiration from the wild. Particularly relating to actual moments were Nile Crocodile (2000) after an experience in Samburu National Park, Kenya, and Joy (2003) from Daphne Sheldrick's elephant orphanage in Tsavo National Park, and Baby Love (2008) from a moment in the rain in the Ngorongoro Conservation Area, Tanzania.

He created a number of drawings including Owl Butterfly (1994), Green Iguana (1993), Sunlight and Shadows (1994) and Young Caiman (1993) after two visits to Venezuela in 1992/93. An evocative piece Iberian Wolves – hope for the future (1994) was inspired by a 7-day trip to the Iberian Wolf Recovery Centre in Portugal. Plea for the Rainforest (1999)came after travelling in Borneo, Indonesia and inspiration for the wild Asian animal drawings was boosted in Nepal in 1995.

Most recently Hodges has photographed and observed green and loggerhead turtles on the Great Barrier Reef in Australia, in The Maldives and Galápagos Islands and used the references for The Incredible Journey. He has also recently visited Costa Rica and Tanzania.

== Conservation groups and people ==
From the beginning of his career Hodges has generously donated well over a million pounds to a range of different conservation groups and other charities. Amongst these are the two he has supported the most, the Born Free Foundation, founded by Virginia McKenna and Bill Travers and The Environmental Investigation Agency co-founded by his civil partner Dave Currey.

His art has touched many people including a celebrity and influential following. In the introduction to the latest book on Hodges, Simon Trapnell, Director of the prestigious Nature in Art museum in Gloucester which held a retrospective of his art in 2010 wrote: "Picasso said that Drawing is a kind of hypnotism: one looks in such a way at the model, that he comes and takes a seat on the paper. Gary is an artist whose subjects take a seat on the paper. They are alive. Right in front of us. His drawings are his way of speaking, and his way of empowering the subject to speak for itself. A few strokes of Gary's pencil invariably hold much more than mere form and line, they can hold immensity. They can't help but draw us to the soul."

Dame Daphne Sheldrick DME has said of Hodges "Gary Hodges' depth of feeling for animals manifests itself in the perfection of his art and his generosity and support for the cause of wildlife conservation. His drawing of two of our orphaned elephants, Ndume and Malaika, hangs in my house, and is one of my most treasured possessions. To me it is the work of a Master, not only accurate in every detail, but subtly portraying the character of the animals with deep sensitivity."

Jenny Seagrove, actress and trustee of Born Free Foundation stated "There's something that goes straight to some very deep part of your soul, straight from the pictures … If ever art was poetry, this is poetry."

== Societies and prizes ==
Accepted as a member of the Society of Wildlife Artists in 1990, Hodges has served three times on the council. One of the responsibilities of council members is to choose work for the annual exhibition. Since 2008 he has also been a judge for the Wildlife Artist of the Year competition organised by the David Shepherd Wildlife Foundation.

Hodges has been a regular artist in residence at the Nature in Art museum in Gloucester since 1991.

Some of his major awards:

- Highly commended Wildlife Magazine Illustrator of the Year, Natural History Museum, London, 1983.
- Best Foreign Exhibit at the second International Festival of Animal Art, France 1993.
- Highly commended BBC World Magazine Wildlife Artist of the Year, 1991.
- Fine Art Trade Guild’s Best Selling Published Artist Award, 1997, only awarded to an artist once in their lifetime. Other awardees include Beryl Cook, David Shepherd, Mackenzie Thorpe and Jack Vettriano.
- John Solomon Trophy (twice) – "Best Selling Images by a Living Artist." Only other artists awarded twice are Jack Vettriano and David Shepherd.
- WWF Artist of the Year (1989 and 1990).
- Visitors Choice Award 2007, Society of Wildlife Artists.

== Exhibitions, auctions and collections ==
Tattoo's other side showing the meerkats

Hodges has exhibited his art at countless charity shows and auctions including:

- Natural History Museum, London, UK in aid of Living Earth 1990
- Natural History Museum, Caracas, Venezuela in aid of Living Earth 1992
- Barbican Centre, London, UK in aid of Friends of the Earth 1990
- Bonhams Auctions, London, UK in aid of Rhino Rock 1992
- Sotheby's Auctions, London, UK in aid of the Royal Society for the Protection of Birds 1991

His solo shows including:

- Robin des Bois Gallery, Paris, France in aid of Robin des Bois 1989
- Medici Gallery, London, UK 1991
- Mall Galleries, London, UK Gary Hodges Wildlife Drawings 1994
- Pacha, Ibiza, Spain – the first ever artist to exhibit in this world-renowned nightclub 2004
- Nature in Art Museum, Gloucester, UK major retrospective Drawn to the Soul 2010

He has exhibited most years since 1989 at the Society of Wildlife Artists' Annual Show at the Mall Galleries, London, UK. His art is held in the British Council collection and the Nature in Art permanent collection.

in 2016 Hodges is exhibiting originals, limited edition prints and embellished prints at the Mall Galleries in Central London at his "Heart & Soul – The Exhibition" 18–23 April. This charity show is a follow up to his highly successful 1994 exhibition. His two favourite charities, EIA and Born Free will be the show's beneficiaries. The ticketed private view of 650 people is already sold out. A book of the same name will be published along with the show. A 16-month 2016/17 Calendar has already been published to coincide and count down to the show.

== London Elephant Parade ==
Approached by friend Rula Lenska, Hodges agreed to decorate a life-size fibre-glass baby elephant for the London Elephant Parade 2010. For him, this was a huge step outside his chosen art medium. He was very pleased with the ideas that came to him and after removing the living room door of his Brixton home to get the elephant in, he lived with the elephant painstakingly realising his ideas. Since the parade was based in London he chose to add a splash of blue by painting the River Thames across the elephant with each side adorned in ripped parts of his own prints. The shape of the river twisting through London is also famous because of the opening credits of the British soap opera EastEnders, which Hodges felt appropriate since his friend Lenska had appeared in this show and another collector Pam St Clement has starred in it for many years. He admits that working in collage and media such as PVA glue were outside his experience. One side of the elephant is a complicated collage of his prints while the other, is humorously and more simply designed around meerkats taken from his drawing Family (2005).

The resulting elephant named Tattoo – Born to be Wild (2010) was displayed in a "herd" in London's Green Park facing Buckingham Palace in the warm summer of 2010. It was later auctioned for £12,500 in aid of the Born Free Foundation. Along with 259 other elephants, mainly in aid of the charity Elephant Family, £4 million was raised for Asian elephant conservation and it was London's biggest ever outdoor art event.

== Books, films and website ==
Hodges work has appeared in a number of different publications including books by Virginia McKenna, Sir Timothy Ackroyd, Lissa Ruben and Peter Wood (Greenpeace).

He has produced four books on his art, Gary Hodges Wildlife Drawings 1994, Drawn to the Soul 2010, Gary Hodges – postcard book (2012) and Heart & Soul (2015). Heart & Soul is an autobiography with portfolio of all his published work to date and was launched at Nature in Art Museum by TV Wildlife presenter Nigel Marven. Heart & Soul My Life and Drawings includes a foreword by Virginia McKenna OBE "You might not guess that this modest and somewhat self-effacing man is the genius behind the extraordinary pictures he creates. His only 'tool' a pencil. But as you read you start to understand the passion behind the pencil." Virginia McKenna chose Gary Hodges' George Adamson with Boy and Christian as her 'favourite painting' in Country Life Magazine in 2014.

Three film documentaries have been about Hodges: "Drawn to Wildlife" broadcast on Animal Planet Channel, "Wild Vision", broadcast on the National Geographic Channel and "Wild at Art" sold as a charity DVD. "Drawn to Wildlife" and "Wild at Art" were produced by David Felber and presented by Rula Lenska. An out-take from "Wild at Art" was shown on "Alright on the Night's All Star Special."

Hodges launched a new website in 2015 website with information about his life, videos, art and inspirations. It also provides updated information on his latest art, exhibitions, publications and a shop.
