= Hell's Kitchen (American TV series) season 17 =

Hell's Kitchen: All Stars
- Season 17
- Promotional poster for season 17, featuring host Ramsay
- Hosted by: Gordon Ramsay
- No. of contestants: 16
- Winner: Michelle Tribble
- Runner-up: Benjamin Knack
- No. of episodes: 16

Release
- Original network: Fox
- Original release: September 29, 2017 – February 2, 2018

Season chronology
- ← Previous; Season 16 Next → Rookies vs. Veterans

The seventeenth season of the American competitive reality television series Hell's Kitchen (officially known as Hell's Kitchen All Stars) premiered on Fox on September 29, 2017, and concluded on February 2, 2018. Gordon Ramsay returned as host and head chef, while British MasterChef judge James "Jocky" Petrie debuted as the Blue Team's sous-chef, replacing Aaron Mitrano, and Christina Wilson returned as the Red Team's sous-chef, replacing Andi Van Willigan-Cutspec. Marino Monferrato returned as maître d'.

The season was won by season 14 semifinalist Michelle Tribble, with season 7 semifinalist Benjamin Knack finishing second.

The season was cast in January 2017.

This was the first season in Hell's Kitchen history to have an all-star edition as 16 former contestants, all of whom earned a black jacket during their original appearances, returned to compete once again (also their first time since season eight returned to 16 contestants instead of 18). It was also the first season to have a theme, which each subsequent season would do from this point on (in the tradition of the first 40 seasons of Survivor).

== Chefs ==
16 returning chefs competed in Season 17.

Contestant	Age (Note: Age at the time of filming)	Hometown	Competed	Finished	Result
Michelle Tribble	26	Dallas, Texas	Season 14	3rd	Winner
Benjamin Knack	41	San Antonio, Texas	Season 7	3rd	Runner-Up
Nick Peters Bond	28	Newburyport, Massachusetts	Season 14	5th	Eliminated during Finals
Milly Medley	37	Philadelphia, Pennsylvania	Season 14	4th	Eliminated before Finals
Robyn Almodovar	36	Fort Lauderdale, Florida	Season 10	6th	Eliminated after Tenth Service
Jennifer Normant	40	Burlington, Massachusetts	Season 9	5th	Eliminated after Black Jackets Challenge
Elise Harris	32	Stafford, Virginia	Season 9	3rd	Eliminated after Black Jackets Challenge
Dana Cohen	32	Emerson, New Jersey	Season 10	3rd	Eliminated after Ninth Service
Barbara "Barbie" Marshall	39	Strasburg, Pennsylvania	Season 10	4th	Eliminated after Eighth Service
Vincent "Van" Hurd	34	South Glastonbury, Connecticut	Season 6	6th	Eliminated after Seventh Service
Amanda "Manda" Palomino	32	Atlantic City, New Jersey	Season 15	5th	Eliminated after Sixth Service
Giovanni Filippone	46	Santa Rosa Beach, Florida	Season 5	6th	Eliminated after Cook for your Life Challenge
Jared Bobkin	31	Troy, Michigan	Season 15	4th	Eliminated after Fifth Service
Josh Trovato	28	Los Angeles, California	Season 14	6th	Ejected during Fourth Service
Ashley Nickell	29	Orlando, Florida	Season 15	3rd	Eliminated after Second Service
Ben Walanka	36	Overland Park, Kansas	Season 5	4th	Eliminated after First Service

== Contestant progress ==
No.	Chef	Original teams			Switched teams								Individuals		Finals	
No.	Chef	1701/1702	1703	1704	1705	1706	1707	1708	1709	1710	1711	1712	1713	1714	1715	1716
1	Michelle	LOSE	LOSE	WIN	WIN	WIN	IN	LOSE	LOSE	LOSE	NOM	IN	BoB	IN	IN	WINNER
2	Benjamin	WIN	WIN	LOSE	WIN	LOSE	IN	WIN	LOSE	WIN	WIN	IN	IN	IN	IN	RUNNER-UP
3	Nick	WIN	WIN	LOSE	WIN	LOSE	IN	WIN	LOSE	WIN	WIN	IN	IN	IN	OUT	Michelle's team
4	Milly	WIN (Note: Milly was immune from elimination)	WIN	LOSE	WIN	LOSE	NOM	WIN	NOM	WIN	WIN	IN	NOM	OUT		Michelle's team
5	Robyn	LOSE	NOM	WIN	WIN	NOM	NOM	WIN	NOM	WIN	WIN	IN	OUT			Benjamin's team
6	Jennifer	LOSE	LOSE	WIN	WIN	WIN	IN	LOSE	LOSE	LOSE	LOSE	OUT				Benjamin's team
7	Elise	NOM	LOSE	WIN	WIN	WIN	NOM	LOSE	NOM	NOM	NOM	OUT				Michelle's team
8	Dana	LOSE	LOSE	WIN	WIN	WIN	IN	LOSE	LOSE	LOSE	OUT					Michelle's team
9	Barbie	LOSE	NOM	WIN	WIN	WIN	NOM	NOM	NOM	OUT						Benjamin's team
10	Van	WIN	WIN	LOSE	WIN	LOSE	IN	WIN	OUT							Benjamin's team
11	Manda	NOM	NOM (Note: Manda was voted up as the fourth nominee, only receiving a couple of votes)	WIN	WIN	WIN	NOM	OUT								
12	Giovanni	WIN	WIN	NOM	WIN	LOSE	OUT									
13	Jared	WIN	WIN	LOSE	WIN	OUT										
14	Josh	WIN	WIN	NOM	EJEC											
15	Ashley	LOSE	OUT (Note: Ashley also received votes to be up for elimination and was the third nominee)													
16	Ben	OUT														

Keywords

- WIN = Won the dinner service
- LOSE = Lost the dinner service
- IN = not nominated for elimination
- NOM = nominated for elimination
- OUT = eliminated normally
- LEFT = withdrew from competition
- HOSP = eliminated due to hospitalization
- EJEC = eliminated during service

Color key
Chef was eliminated after regular nomination
Chef was eliminated after Ramsay's nomination
Chef was eliminated without nomination
Chef was eliminated from winning team
Chef was eliminated in the Cook For Your Life challenge
Chef was nominated to participate in the Cook For Your Life challenge
Chef was eliminated during service
Chef withdrew from the competition
Chef was the Best of the Best/Worst
Chef was retained after regular nomination
Chef was retained after Ramsay's nomination
Chef's nomination was voided
The winner of Hell's Kitchen
The runner-up of Hell's Kitchen

== Episodes ==
No. overall	No. in season	Title	Original release date	U.S. viewers (millions)
251	1	"All-Stars Arrive"	September 29, 2017	3.02
Ramsay called up 16 chefs from previous seasons and invited them back to compete again in Hell's Kitchen. When they arrived, they recalled the friendships and rivalries they formed throughout their previous appearances. While some were happy to reunite with their old teammates, others were not, such as Robyn and Dana towards Barbie, Nick towards Josh and especially Jennifer towards Elise. After pleasantries, Ramsay introduced the chefs and sous-chefs Christina and Jocky to a live audience. He then revealed that the winner of the season would become the head chef at the new Hell's Kitchen restaurant in Las Vegas. Team challenge/signature dish: Unlike previous seasons, the chefs were given different ingredients which they used to make new signature dishes; those with the same ingredients went head-to-head. Ramsay rated each dish on a 1–5 scale. Ashley and Jared each scored four on duck, while on chicken, Barbie beat Ben three to two. Both Giovanni and Jennifer scored three on lamb while on scallops, Michelle scored four over Nick's three. On pork chop, Milly beat Manda four to three. On filet, Dana beat Josh four to two, but both Van and Elise scored a perfect five on lobster. Finally, on the last round, with the score 26–23 in favor of the women, Robyn and Benjamin were up with their salmon dishes. Benjamin scored five while Robyn scored a one, with Ramsay describing her dish as "disgusting", and the men won 28–27. Reward/punishment: The men went to Downtown Los Angeles to slide down the Skyslide at the U.S. Bank Tower and celebrate their win with Marino. They then enjoyed dinner with Ramsay at celebrity chef Wolfgang Puck's restaurant WP24, where they had their food prepared by Puck himself. The women were forced to break down the bleachers and remove the red carpet and confetti outside. While they were angry at Robyn for costing them the challenge and puzzled at her demonstration of a fortune-telling rock (Elise even suggested that the rock could have told her when to cook the salmon), they were even more annoyed at Elise for not helping out with the bleachers. Challenge – Part 1: Ramsay announced to the teams that an individual challenge would take place before service that would have them cook a dish for the new bar menu with immunity on the line, as the episode ended in a cliffhanger.
252	2	"Raising the Bar"	October 6, 2017	2.80
Challenge – Part 2: Continuing from the last episode, the chefs were given 40 minutes to create a bar menu item; the winner of the challenge would have their dish featured on the menu throughout the whole season and earned immunity from tonight's elimination. The sous-chefs then sampled each dish and selected their top four from each team, from which Ramsay picked the top four. The women were represented by Dana, Ashley, Elise and Michelle, while the men were represented by Milly, Jared, Van and Nick. The final four were Michelle, Milly, Elise and Van; ultimately, Milly's seafood poutine beat out Van's carne asada tacos, Michelle's lobster roll and Elise's lemon pepper chicken wings, and he won immunity. Michelle expressed disappointment at this, as she felt her dish had been more adventurous, whereas Milly's had been something he had made numerous times before. After the challenge, Ben started to feel unwell and admitted to his teammates that he had recently been diagnosed with diabetes. With 30 minutes to dinner service, he went to see the medic, who took his vitals as he continued to worry about his diabetes and at this point had to decide if he were to take the chance or if he was out. Ultimately, he decided to stay. Dinner Service: A Hell's Kitchen first featured chef's tables on opening night, with former American Idol winner Jordin Sparks and Tony Award-winning actor Joe Mantegna sitting dining in the red and blue kitchens, respectively. Actor French Stewart and singers Keith Sweat and Kirstin Maldonado sat in the dining room. Dana and Milly served a special shrimp and pasta appetizer tableside. Josh served perfect cold appetizers though took too long, while Ben and Jared undercooked the salmon; the former suddenly became unbalanced, forcing the latter to catch him before he fell. After that, the men finished service without further problems, thanks to Nick and Giovanni's strong performance on meat. In the red kitchen, Ashley served a soupy carbonara but recovered. Robyn delivered perfect lobster wellingtons; however, Elise served multiple raw and overcooked New York strips, and Ramsay ordered the whole team to apologize to the customers, after which Giovanni was asked to help the women so they could finally serve entrees. However, Manda sent up a raw salmon for the chef's table, followed by one with burnt skin, leading Ramsay to kick the women out of the kitchen with the men finishing opening night on a strong note. Elimination: The women quickly agreed on Manda as the first nominee, and despite Elise and Barbie attempting to put up Robyn for not doing enough to help Elise on the meat station, Elise herself was named as the second. Ramsay polled the rest of the women regarding who they would send home, but to the shock of everyone eliminated Ben, deeming him not physically fit enough to handle the stress and demands of the competition. This made him the eighth chef to be eliminated despite being on the winning team. Ramsay's comment: "Big Ben? More like big liability. He clearly wasn't going to be able to keep up, so I had to let him down." After elimination: After returning to the dorms, the episode ended on another cliffhanger as the argument between Elise and Robyn began to implode.
253	3	"Tower of Terror"	October 13, 2017	2.87
After elimination – continued: Robyn and Elise had a heated argument over the previous service which was only stopped when Manda dragged the former to another room. Before the next challenge, Josh threw up after eating vitamins and a chimichanga for breakfast. Team Challenge: Ramsay demonstrated the effectiveness of a chef's hands by having a young boy named Matthew over to play a game of cup stacking. Michelle and Jared then going head-to-head, with the former easily winning in just 18 seconds, and the latter taking over a minute longer. The women gained a 30-second head start for the actual challenge, which saw the teams recreate Ramsay's four-tiered seafood tower as the chefs worked in pairs to replicate each tier. The men were short a member, so Benjamin went twice. Despite the advantage, the women lost the challenge by a matter of seconds after Elise and Michelle fell behind on the second tier due to the former adding ice instead of helping the latter shuck the oysters. Reward/punishment: The men went to Mastro's Ocean Club in Malibu where they ate a seafood lunch with sous-chef Jocky. They then played soccer with U.S. Olympic champions Alyssa Naeher and Julie Johnston. The women were forced to take in deliveries of seafood, prepare it for service, clean the kitchens, and were served a disgusting fish dish for lunch, causing Barbie to vomit over Dana and Robyn's graphic descriptions. Elise tried to weasel out of the dish, but sous-chef Christina forced her to eat it. As they were unloaded the deliveries, Barbie annoyed her teammates by telling them what to do. Dinner Service: Naeher and Johnston attended service, as well as professional golfer Jon Rahm and Philadelphia Eagles player Zach Ertz (Johnston's husband). Michelle and Giovanni served a seafood appetizer tableside. The men had another near-perfect service thanks to Milly's leadership, save for Josh briefly getting confused on orders until Jared helped him out, and Van momentarily delaying a ticket by not having the salmon quite ready in time. While the women had a good start on appetizers, they soon fell apart on entrees. Despite cooking perfect meat, Barbie openly argued with Robyn, who undercooked the salmon. Ashley was sent to the bar temporarily for being distracted by her watch, and Manda again struggled on garnish. After Robyn overcooked the salmon and Barbie ruined three pieces of meat, Ramsay gave the team one more chance, only for Ashley to overcook the lobster wellington and Robyn to undercook the halibut. An angry Ramsay threw the women out for the second time in a row. He then followed them into the back hallway, called their performance even worse than the previous one while demanding two nominees, and had the men finish their service. Elimination: The women agreed to put up Barbie and Robyn but when the former was asked for the nominations, she stated that the team also considered Ashley and Manda due both of them struggling on their respective stations. Ramsay agreed and brought up all four, ultimately eliminating Ashley for not doing much in service and lacking fightback. Ramsay's comment: "Ashley spent more time staring at her watch than paying attention to her station. And so, her time here on Hell's Kitchen is done."
254	4	"Just Letter Cook"	October 20, 2017	2.86
Team Challenge: Ramsay brought the teams together for a game of chance. The chefs took turns naming ingredients that started with a given letter, until one team could not think of any and lost the round. The team that won each round got to keep one of the named ingredients for themselves as well as assign one to their opponents. Each team member had to cook an individual dish using all of the ingredients on their team's list. The women held on to earn their first challenge victory, 26–25. Reward/punishment: The women flew in a private plane to Santa Barbara and stayed at the Belmond El Encanto resort. The men took in a delivery of potatoes and then sifted through the garbage to find what was recyclable. During the punishment, Josh's teammates became infuriated with him after he revealed he was a celebrity caterer who only worked three hours a day. Dinner Service: Former Playboy Playmate Shannon Tweed and MMA fighter Paige VanZant sat at the red and blue chef's tables respectively. Both kitchens had to work together to serve a twelve-top for a guest celebrating his 30th birthday. The women had a near-flawless performance, as Michelle and Jennifer both managed to properly coordinate the kitchens so the twelve-top could be served. Their only real problems were Michelle adding too much garlic to the risotto and Barbie serving cold mashed potatoes and accidentally grabbing Ramsay's cooking cloth. In the men's kitchen, Josh held up the team on appetizers and then twice sent up too many portions of risotto, and he was forced to eat the leftovers with the chef's table guests. He was also berated for using a stopwatch to calculate the risottos' cooking times. Giovanni sent up a burnt pork alongside a properly cooked one, and Benjamin and Jared undercooked the duck for the twelve-top, forcing Jennifer to step in. Benjamin's cold beef wellington got the men thrown out as the women finished their service. Team change: The men unanimously picked Josh as the first nominee before selecting Giovanni as the second. Benjamin stated that the men considered Josh their weakest member, which the rest of the team agreed with after questioning. Ramsay transferred him to the red team, much to their dismay, and moved Robyn to the blue team, believing the former's team had given up on him while he himself had not seen either Josh or the latter perform at their best, giving them both one more chance. Notably, Robyn and Josh also switched teams during their previous Hell's Kitchen appearances in Seasons 10 and 14, respectively.
255	5	"Josh Josh Josh"	November 3, 2017	3.10
Team Challenge: Outside Hell's Kitchen, Ramsay explained the practice of cooking fish over wood planks, which was the chefs' their next challenge. Each team was split into three pairs of two and with one member cooking alone, then given 45 minutes to prepare their dishes, cooked over a fire pit with a plank of cedar or hickory wood. Chef Ben Ford (actor Harrison Ford's son) was the guest judge. During the challenge, Josh earned his new teammates' ire by smothering their fire with cold coals. The challenge ended in a 3–3 tie, but ultimately the judges picked Robyn and Nick's chimichurri-basted cod and smoked orange and fennel salad as the best dish over Elise's cedar-grilled salmon and mustard aioli, giving the blue team the win. Reward/punishment: The blue team headed down to Apex Farm in the California foothills and enjoyed a horseback ride. The red team also traveled to Apex Farm, but was forced to clean horse manure in a pen. Manda and Josh argued throughout the punishment as she was frustrated with his condescending attitude, while the rest of the team felt that he cost them the challenge by putting out their fire. Dinner Service: Actor Shaun Brown attended service. Van and Barbie served a special tableside appetizer of smoked salmon rillette. In the blue kitchen, Benjamin mistakenly put oil on a non-stick pan to cook the scallops but recovered, though he irritated his teammates by constantly responding "oui chef" to Ramsay; ironically, the latter didn't seem to mind. Robyn accidentally dropped an order of chicken and undercooked the beef wellington and Milly had trouble communicating with Nick on garnish. Otherwise, they had a decent service. In the red kitchen, Josh was slow on the fish and chips, leading Manda to repeatedly take over the garnish station. He later delivered salty spinach and liquid mashed potatoes and got kicked out for handling cold garnish with his bare hands when the protein it was supposed to go with was already at the pass. The red team performed much better after this, though Elise earned some of her teammates' ire by standing around and doing nothing. Automatic elimination: After a while, Josh decided to come back to the kitchen and fight his way back in. Ramsay pulled him into the pantry and eliminated him on the spot for his poor performances, stubbornness and failure to improve upon his past mistakes, sending him out through the front door. He became the eighth chef to be eliminated during service, the second after switching teams (after Lacey in season 5), and the second who was asked to use the front door (after Gabriel in season 12). Ramsay didn't give an explanation for Josh's elimination, and his jacket was not hung up, nor was his picture burned. After service, Ramsay declared both teams winners (the first such instance since season 13), meaning that nobody else would be sent home.
256	6	"A Little Slice of Hell"	November 10, 2017	3.11
After Josh's elimination and the post-service meeting, Ramsay told all the chefs to get some rest, as big changes were coming. Everyone was relieved that Josh was gone, with Milly specifically stating that every remaining chef hated Josh and that he was, skill-wise, not at any of their levels. They all sat around drinking and talking about each other's sex lives, making fun of who they thought was "vanilla," and who might be a freak in the bed. Suddenly, Van fell into the hot tub. Team Challenge: For their next challenge, the teams visited DeSano Pizzeria and Bakery. Certain chefs selected an opponent to cook against and then spun a pizza-shaped wheel to determine which cuisine they would cook. Giovanni was the only blue team chef not picked, so he chose to join Giovanni and Michelle and make a French-inspired pizza. The guest judges were Marino and chef Steve Samson In the last round, Michelle beat Giovanni on France, winning the challenge for the red team. Giovanni's pizza was delicious, but it was completely burnt on the bottom, which his teammates were unaware of when they dropped Benjamin's pizza. Reward/punishment: The Red Team toured Hollywood on a double-decker bus on their way to the Magic Castle, where they were entertained by magician Joel Ward. The Blue Team prepared the dining room for Italian night. Dinner Service: 2012 Miss Universe Olivia Culpo and Victoria's Secret model Devon Windsor dined in the blue kitchen, while actress Melissa Fumero dined in the red. Nick and Elise served a tableside Italian seafood entree. Robyn forgot to drop her scallops due to a miscommunication with Benjamin while Van and Giovanni undercooked the lamb, and Ramsay berated the former in the pantry for laughing at his criticism of the latter falling behind. Jared got overwhelmed on garnish and gave inconsistent timings before suddenly calling for a medic, claiming he had a cut on his finger. After Robyn and Giovanni overcooked the salmon and veal, Ramsay called the medic over to confirm that Jared didn't cut himself and kicked the blue team out of the kitchen. In the red kitchen, Manda needed help tasting her carbonara for doneness due to having celiac disease, but Michelle twice misinformed her into sending up raw pasta. She managed to serve an acceptable portion after Elise took over tasting duty. Michelle had a strong performance on the meat station with the exception of slipping while trying to cook lamb, which Manda considered to be karma for her pasta error. Elise also annoyed her teammates by trying to offer unwanted help on their stations. The red team nevertheless completed a strong, solid service. Elimination: After a long, heated debate, the blue team nominated Jared and Robyn. The former continued to insist that he truly had cut himself, while the latter pled to be sent back to the red team. Ramsay eliminated Jared for faking the injury and performing poorly in service; he reiterated in his exit interview that he did cut himself. Ramsay's comment: "Medic? More like, pathetic. While Jared's cut was imaginary, now he knows what it really is like to get cut."
257	7	"Trimming Fat"	November 17, 2017	3.21
Team Challenge: The teams were given 25 minutes to cook six of the most popular entrees on the Hell's Kitchen menu: beef wellington, salmon, halibut, rack of lamb, duck breast and double-boned pork chop. However, every three minutes, each team had to kick out one member, which ultimately left Nick and Michelle as the only ones left in their respective kitchens until everyone was called back in during the last three minutes. The blue team won 5–3 after the Red Team served raw lamb and pork. Reward/punishment: The blue team went to a world-class rock climbing gym and ate at the Bourbon Steak at the Americana at Brand and were joined by sous-chefs Christina and Jocky. The red team had to work with Marino in cleaning the dining room and kitchen along with polishing his shoes and preparing for service. Cook For Your Life Challenge: Instead of a service, Ramsay announced the Cook For Your Life challenge. Since Michelle and Nick were the last to remain in their respective kitchens, they had the privilege to nominate the three weakest chefs on their teams to participate. Michelle nominated Barbie, Elise and Manda, while Nick nominated Giovanni, Milly and Robyn. The six chefs were tasked with recreating Ramsay's signature dish of champagne and oysters in 30 minutes. Elimination: Before the judging, Elise broke down in tears, feeling as though she didn't deserve to be put up for the challenge. Milly was sent to safety first (despite preparing only five oysters instead of six as required), followed by Manda, Barbie and Elise, leaving Giovanni and Robyn as the last two. Elise confronted Michelle in the dorms for getting nominated. Robyn was saved last despite puncturing two of her oysters, leaving Giovanni to be eliminated for putting too much pasta and not enough sauce on each oyster, though Ramsay wished him and his family luck. Ramsay's comment: "Giovanni may have age and experience, but his attention to detail in this critical challenge was a big disappointment. Arrivederci, Giovanni."
258	8	"Welcome to the Jungle"	December 1, 2017	2.80
Team Challenge: Ramsay announced that the teams would be cooking with three of the earliest meats hunted by man: boar, venison and elk. Each had three minutes to hunt for five ingredients for each of their protein and had 45 minutes to cook their dishes. Each team had two members cooking each protein, minus Nick, the lone blue chef cooking venison. Ramsay brought in guest chefs Vinny Dotolo and Jon Shook. Van and Elise each scored a point for their walnut-crusted wild boar loin and venison and yam puree respectively, but in a big surprise, Robyn's elk and chimichurri sauce beat out Barbie's elk and chili-braised bok choy, and the Blue Team won. Ramsay even welcomed Robyn back after a string of poor performances. Reward/punishment: The Blue Team went on an exclusive mountain retreat at Hummingbird Nest Ranch while indulging in luxury caviar from Petrossian, provided by executive chef Alex Ageneau. The Red Team had to clean the dorms and iron the waiting staff's aprons. During the punishment, Michelle tried to apologize to Elise for putting her up in the Cook For Your Life Challenge, but the latter rudely rejected her apology. Dinner Service: A caviar blini appetizer special was included on the main menu. Later that night, Ramsay received a last-minute VIP booking from Goo Goo Dolls frontman John Rzeznik, who sat at the red chef's table. The Blue Team had a perfect service, with all five members communicating well, and none of their dishes were cooked incorrectly. Ramsay praised this, only needing to lecture Robyn for calling her teammates "Baby". In the red kitchen, Elise was slow on the caviar appetizer and needed Jennifer's help. The kitchen came to a halt on entrees when Manda didn't hear an order of pork for one table and Barbie undercooked the duck. The latter later sent up a raw chicken that Michelle thought was cooked. After Barbie and Manda again undercooked the duck and pork respectively, Ramsay kicked the red team out for having their worst service yet and asked for two nominees, with the blue team finishing their remaining tickets. Elimination: The red team nominated Manda and Barbie, although Elise wanted to put up Michelle. Despite Barbie's horrendous performance on the meat station, Ramsay pinpointed Manda's forgotten pork as the main reason for the team's defeat and eliminated her, but praised her for her hard work and determination. Ramsay's comment: "Manda said she never heard the ticket that sunk her team. Sadly, she's not going to hear her name being called as the winner of Hell's Kitchen either."
259	9	"Catch of the Day"	December 8, 2017	2.96
Team Challenge: The chefs were brought to a manmade lake outside Hell's Kitchen. They had to hook lures containing different ingredients to their fish's mouth and then throw it to their teammates. Each team had to prepare five fish dishes: Dover sole, red snapper, grouper, Arctic char and cod. Michael Cimarusti served as a guest judge. The blue team won, 4–2. Reward/punishment: The blue team flew to Las Vegas in a private plane and stayed overnight at Caesars Palace. They also went on the world's tallest Ferris wheel, the Linq High Roller, with sous-chef Christina. The red team had to bring in hundreds of pounds of fish, then descale and fillet them. They were also served a disgusting protein shake for lunch. Barbie threw away her entire shake, only to get caught by sous-chef Jocky, who then forced the rest of the team to finish their serving, causing Dana, Elise and Michelle to vomit. Dinner Service: This service featured an Asian fusion menu. Dancing with the Stars judge Cheryl Burke and actor Dan Bucatinsky dined at the red and blue chef's tables, while actor Aleks Paunovic and rapper E–40 sat in the dining room. Barbie, despite being advised by sous-chef Christina to lead, and Elise fought for control of the kitchen all night. The former delivered a raw New York strip to the pass, earning the entire team a trip to the pantry. Burke informed Barbie that her duck was slightly undercooked; the latter offered to cook another serving of duck, but the former declined. Nevertheless, Barbie ordered Elise to prepare more garnish, an argument ensued and Ramsay ordered both of them to sort out their differences in the pantry. In the blue kitchen, Milly brought up a raw New York strip but recovered. Van failed to respond when Ramsay asked for a time on the salmon and proceeded to bring up an overcooked portion; the latter threatened to throw him out for being non-communicative. Even though both teams completed service, they were declared losers and each asked for two nominees. Elimination: The blue team nominated Robyn and Milly, but Ramsay called down Van as well. He eliminated Van for his lack of communication on fish, much to the disbelief of the other chefs, but encouraged him to keep his head up. The red team nominated Elise and Barbie, but Ramsay simply sent them both back in line with a final warning. Ramsay's comment: "Van's always had one of the loudest voices here. Tonight, not only did he lose his voice but also his dream of becoming my next head chef."
260	10	"It's All Gravy"	December 15, 2017	3.04
Team Challenge: Ramsay announced that the annual Blind Taste Test was the next challenge, and for this season, the teams would taste herbs and spices mixed into a mashed potato puree. While one chef tasted the ingredients, one of their teammates would be in a chair in front of a mashed potato cannon and would get splattered with mashed potatoes for two incorrect guesses, gravy for three and both punishments for four. Robyn scored three points while Dana failed to score any, resulting in Michelle getting messy. Nick scored two while Jennifer also failed to score any (resulting in Dana getting messy), and Benjamin scored three points while Barbie scored two. With Elise and Milly about to go, Ramsay warned the red team that if Elise did not catch up to the blue team, the challenge would be over. The blue team automatically won 8–2 after Elise missed all three ingredients, so Michelle did not taste. This is the first Blind Taste Test that was won before the final round. Ramsay complimented the blue team as all five chefs avoided getting gravy dumped on them. Reward/punishment: The blue team went to chef Roy Yamaguchi's restaurant Roy's Hawaiian Fusion for lunch and received Vitamix blenders while at the restaurant. The red team was forced to clean up the dining room then separate peppercorns and grind them by hand. During the punishment, sous-chef Christina noticed some animosity in the red team and asked them if they could promise a good dinner service, but Dana refused to do so as she did not have faith in Barbie. Dinner Service: For one night only, Hell's Kitchen hosted a private dinner service for two charities. The blue team cooked for Shane's Inspiration, whose table featured founder Scott Williams and actor David Koechner. The red team cooked for the Leukemia & Lymphoma Society, whose table featured TV personality Jill Wagner and actors Mindy Sterling and Tyler Posey. One chef from each team took charge of a course, though Nick had to lead both the scallop appetizer and the passionfruit soufflé dessert with the blue team down a member. On the scallop course, led by Michelle and Nick, the former noticed that she was missing three scallops and Milly overcooked multiple portions. Jennifer led well on lobster spaghetti, while Robyn tried to start the course before the scallops were served, and plated more pasta than needed. On the striped bass course, Milly led vocally and got his plates out with no problems, but in the red kitchen, the sauce completely lacked seasoning and most of the bass was burnt, causing Elise to accuse her team of sabotaging her, despite her not checking the fish before serving them. Similarly, Benjamin led the beef filet Rossini course well, despite Milly sending up cold foie gras, while Barbie screamed aggressively at Michelle over a side of spinach and all the potatoes were burnt, greatly dismaying Ramsay. Dana and Nick had no issues with their desserts. Ramsay called the red team's performance the "worst-ever charity dinner performance in the entire competition" and tasked them with coming up with two nominees. Elimination: During the deliberation, Barbie and Elise became confrontational, accusing Michelle of refusing to prepare the beef garnish, and Jennifer of burning the bass. Nonetheless, the former two were nominated. Ramsay eliminated Barbie for her aggressive leadership at service along with her failure to bounce back quickly but praised her for her heart. He then remarked that the blue team's remaining four members would likely make up the final four. Ramsay's comment: "Barbie's performance at charity night was a disaster. So, I performed a charity act for her team by sending her home."
261	11	"Trying to Pasta Test"	January 5, 2018	3.42
Before the challenge began, Jennifer made a pact with her season 9 archrival Elise to knock out Dana and Michelle, whom they believed weaker and to be in their own clique. Team Challenge: Late in the evening, Ramsay announced the following day's challenge: the teams had to make three portions of a gourmet pasta dish on a limited budget. They traveled to Jim's Fallbrook Market, where they were each given $20 and 10 minutes to shop for their ingredients. Back in Hell's Kitchen, they had 45 minutes to cook their dishes. James Beard Award winner Lachlan Mackinnon-Patterson from Boulder, Colorado and executive chef Bruce Kalman from Pasadena were the guest judges. Each gave a score based on how much they would pay for the dish. Michelle and Elise initially puzzled Ramsay by attempting to make a soup dumpling and a twist on paella, respectively, but their dishes were both well-received and Milly's chicken meatball pasta was not, and the women won $320–$313. It was the first time they won a challenge since Episode 6. Reward/punishment: The red team went go-karting at the MB2 Raceway and enjoyed lunch. In addition, Michelle's Asian-inspired tortellini soup was put on the menu for being the highest-scoring dish. The blue team was forced to clean the pantries. Dinner Service: Actors Tyler Hilton, Sebastian Roché and Keesha Sharp attended service. Both teams got off to strong starts on appetizers but both struggled on meat. In the red kitchen, Dana severely burned several lobster wellingtons, forcing Ramsay to flip the ticket, and undercooked the lamb. In the blue kitchen, Robyn undercooked the wellington and was criticized for interrupting Ramsay. She had trouble communicating with Benjamin on garnish, incorrectly repeated a ticket and sent up two beef wellingtons when one was on order, earning a trip to the storeroom. Despite that, both teams pushed entrees out and with three tickets left each, Ramsay announced that the first team to finish service would win. On the last table, Dana overcooked the wellington, then undercooked the refire, and the red team got thrown out for the fourth time this season. Elimination: Despite being told to nominate two people, the red team could not decide between Dana, Michelle and Elise due to Jennifer and Elise ganging up against Michelle. Ramsay called all three of them down, ultimately eliminating Dana for her lack of leadership and poor performance on meat. Ramsay's comment: "In two seasons, this was Dana's first time ever being nominated. Unfortunately for her, it was also her last."
262	12	"Five is the New Black"	January 12, 2018	3.56
The final seven were look forward to the next team challenge, only discover two magicians performing a demonstration of changing outfits which ended with the reveal of a black jacket as the final outfit. Ramsay announced that the chefs would be competing in a series of challenges to earn a black jacket, and two of them would be sent home. Black Jacket Challenge 1: The first challenge was Taste It, Now Make It. The chefs had 45 minutes to recreate Ramsay's sea bass dish. Everyone correctly identified the protein as sea bass. Milly got the first black jacket for being the only one to identify the white and green purees, which were white asparagus and Romanesco respectively. Nick and Benjamin each identified four out of five ingredients in the hash: celery root, fava beans, apples and chives, only missing sweet potato. Nick earned the second black jacket because Benjamin's bass was slightly burnt. He and Milly received passes to the black jacket lounge. Black Jacket Challenge 2: In the next challenge, the remaining chefs were presented with five domes of ingredients: protein, starch, vegetable, wild card and garnish. Each time the bell was rung, the chefs had to race to grab an ingredient from the dome, which they would be required to use in their dish. Jennifer and Elise were criticized for serving raw potatoes and leaving the digestive tract on her lobster, respectively. Michelle's veal chops and Benjamin's filet mignon earned them the next two black jackets and passes to the lounge. Before their final challenge, Jennifer urged Robyn to beat Elise. Black Jacket Challenge 3: For the final challenge, Elise, Jennifer and Robyn were given 30 minutes to cook whatever they wanted with a full range of ingredients in the kitchen. The black jacket chefs watched the challenge on a live video feed, but it cut out after the challenge ended. Robyn made a seared lamb loin with potato and corn hash (despite having initially selected halibut as her primary protein), Elise prepared a filet mignon with potato puree and rainbow chard, and Jennifer made scallops and shrimp with butter and corn succotash. Elimination: Ramsay first eliminated Elise for undercooking her steak and putting her potatoes in the blender, making the puree gummy, but urged her to keep her head up high. He then asked sous-chefs Jocky and Christina to taste Robyn and Jennifer's dishes; ultimately awarding the former the last black jacket as the latter's scallops were slightly undercooked. Before leaving, Ramsay praised Jennifer for her improvement since season 9. Though disappointed in her elimination, Jennifer believed Robyn won the black jacket fairly and was content with outlasting Elise. After Robyn entered the black jacket Lounge, Ramsay and the sous-chefs brought champagne and congratulated the remaining chefs for being in the final five. Jennifer and Elise were both allowed to keep their jackets; Ramsay did not comment on either one's elimination and neither received a picture burning sequence.
263	13	"Stars Heating Up Hell"	January 19, 2018	3.17
Individual Challenge: For their first black jacket challenge, the chefs had to teach professional athletes how to cook their signature dishes, which they had planned to make in the first challenge of the season, in 45 minutes. The pairings were as follows: Milly-Ricky Williams, Michelle-Candace Parker, Benjamin-Shawne Merriman, Nick-Jordyn Wieber and Robyn-Reggie Miller. Ramsay judged the dishes King of the Hill style. Nick's peppercorn-rusted scallops with celery root puree impressed, but Robyn's pan-seared scallops with pasta and uni sauce dethroned him. Milly's three applications of sea bass in turn dethroned Robyn. Ultimately, Michelle's sea bass with pasta and miso beet puree dethroned Milly and beat out Benjamin's smoked lamb loin with roasted cauliflower, winning the challenge. Reward/punishment: Michelle toured Downtown Los Angeles in a helicopter and ate lunch at 71Above; she chose Nick to join her. The other chefs had to participate in deep cleaning day. During the punishment, Robyn got annoyed with Milly for eating the leftover food from the challenge instead of working. Dinner Service: Rapper/musician Wyclef Jean dined at the chef's table. Former 2 Broke Girls stars Jonathan Kite and Matthew Moy attended service, in addition to actor Janina Gavankar. Milly had a messy workspace on appetizers and failed to notice a pan catching on fire. He also struggled to make the hot and cold appetizers at the same time, requiring Nick and Robyn's help, but managed to recover. Benjamin failed to communicate on meat and annoyed everyone with his constant "oui chef" reply. Michelle performed well on fish, only having trouble when she was slow to bring up the halibut sauce, while Nick undercooked the New York strip for the chef's table, but also recovered. Robyn delivered bland couscous and had trouble keeping up on garnish. She also earned the team a trip to the pantry after burning the Brussels sprouts and talking back to Ramsay. Despite the speed bumps, the black jackets finished service with no further problems. Ramsay named Michelle the Best of the Best as she was the only one not to make any major errors and told her to nominate two teammates. Elimination: Michelle nominated Robyn and Milly. Robyn accused Milly of slacking off during the punishment and service; Ramsay sent the latter back in line and eliminated the former for being the weakest of the black jackets but praised her for improving strongly after her poor start and allowed her to keep her jacket. Ramsay's comment: "I've always admired Robyn's no-nonsense attitude, but tonight she had the wrong attitude and served up a lot of nonsense."
264	14	"Families Come to Hell"	January 26, 2018	3.43
While the others headed back to the dorms, Ramsay called Milly over to remind him that the fighting and conflict wasn't necessary. He acknowledged this in a confessional and apologized. Before the next challenge, the final four's loved ones (Michelle's sister and nephews, Nick's husband and mom, Benjamin's wife and daughters, and Milly's girlfriend and infant son) were invited for some time together. Individual Challenge: A Christmas tree was set up in the dining room, with four presents underneath. The chefs each selected one, then had 45 minutes to prepare three portions of a holiday-inspired dish using the ingredients inside. Afterwards, Ramsay invited their loved ones for a blind judging, where each person would vote for their top two dishes. Benjamin's chestnut-crusted salmon and Michelle's seared venison loin each received three votes, while Nick's peppercorn-encrusted filet mignon received two and Milly's lobster tail macaroni and cheese none. Ramsay broke the tie in favor of Benjamin. Reward/punishment: Benjamin rode with Ramsay in a Ferrari to lunch with his family while Nick, Michelle and Milly had to clean the Hell's Kitchen SUV's as well as the dining room. During the punishment, they made a pact, as season 14 representatives, to become the final three. Dinner Service: For this service, each of the final four had a turn on the pass, with Ramsay not only testing their leadership skills, but also their quality control, as sous-chefs Christina and Jocky would make intentional mistakes. In attendance that night were actors Anna Konkle and Gabrielle Dennis. Benjamin was up first and managed to catch Christina serving a carbonara with spaghetti instead of fettuccine, but he failed to notice carrots being used in place of butternut squash in the risotto. Milly missed an intentional ticket mistake from Marino but became vocal and caught Christina giving him shrimp instead of lobster as well as multiple mistakes from Michelle on mashed potatoes. The latter sent back Milly's undercooked halibut and noticed Christina giving her the wrong garnish (it was supposed to be creamed spinach) but mistook ribeye for New York strip. Nick missed Jocky sending up a veal chop instead of a pork chop but caught Christina serving creamed spinach instead of creamed leeks and Michelle serving duck sauce rather than lamb sauce, while Milly struggled to poach an egg. After service, Ramsay told the chefs to think of one person they wanted to be with in the finals. Elimination: During the elimination, the other chefs said that Nick was the one they wanted to compete against. Ramsay then eliminated Milly but said he was happy to give him a second chance, praised his confidence and allowed him to keep his jacket. In an unprecedented step, he offered him the opportunity to come to London for a week and stage at his flagship three-Michelin starred Restaurant Gordon Ramsay. Milly enthusiastically accepted and left. Afterwards, Ramsay picked Nick as the first finalist and praised him for growing more than any other chef in the competition. Benjamin became the second for his calm, collected leadership that night. However, in another unprecedented move, Ramsay named Michelle the third, marking the first season in Hell's Kitchen history with three finalists. Ramsay's comment: “Milly has had two fantastic runs in Hell’s Kitchen. I’m personally going to make sure that that big, kindhearted man, with so much culinary passion, gets the right training he deserves.”
265	15	"Final Three"	February 2, 2018	3.36
Individual Challenge: The finalists were each assigned a sous-chef: Michelle got Jocky, Nick got Christina and Benjamin got chef Kesha Tatro; the sous-chefs helped them prepare a five-course tasting menu, consisting of a hot and cold appetizer and a chicken, beef and seafood entree, in one hour. During the challenge, Nick overcooked the beurre blanc for one of his dishes but managed to recover with the help of sous-chef Christina. After sampling all the dishes, Ramsay was unable to decide on a winner. Reward: Michelle, Benjamin and Nick traveled to Calamigos Ranch in Malibu, to attend an awards ceremony for the fictitious California Culinary Association, where Ramsay took the stage and announced that they would be cooking their menus again for the executive staff of Caesars Entertainment Group. Individual Challenge -- Part 2: The dishes from each category were judged by one of five executives: general manager Sean McBurney; vice president of food and beverage Cory Johnson; Caesar's Palace president Gary Selesner; Caesar's Entertainment global president Tom Jenkin and CEO Mark Frissora, each of whom would rate each dish on a scale from one to 10. With only the beef entrees left to be judged, all three finalists were tied at 34 points each, so Frissora would effectively decide which two would advance. After sampling the dishes, he named Michelle as the first finalist and Benjamin as the second, eliminating Nick, who was put back in line with the returning chefs of the season. Michelle was granted first pick out of her fellow competitors to draft a brigade for the final dinner service. She chose Nick, Dana, and Milly. Benjamin selected Jennifer, Van, and Robyn. The episode ended on a cliffhanger before Michelle could decide between Elise and Barbie to round out her team.
266	16	"All-Star Finale"	February 2, 2018	3.36
Continued from the previous episode, Michelle picked Elise, so Benjamin was left with Barbie. Dinner Service: Before dinner service, while both teams prepped their menus, Elise continued to give Michelle attitude until Nick told her to shut up or go home. Actor Lamorne Morris and the finalists' families were in attendance for the last dinner service of the season. In the red kitchen, Dana needed Michelle's help in assembling the hamachi appetizer, prompting Ramsay to give the latter a pep talk in the storeroom. Marino returned two risottos from Morris' table after a minor complaint about the broth, but Elise recovered and successfully re-fired them. Ramsay then scolded Nick for attempting to call nine entrees in a single sitting. Meanwhile in the blue kitchen, Barbie did well on the hot appetizers for Benjamin, despite only having been on that station once during the season. On entrees, Jennifer served two portions of raw bass twice. Robyn then served multiple raw and burnt filets, prompting Ramsay to accuse her of sabotaging Benjamin. When she finally brought up an acceptable filet, the lamb was raw. She then refired the lamb in the same pan that had been used to cook the steak, a cross-contamination hazard. Seeing Benjamin's passive handling of the situation, Ramsay had no choice but to throw Robyn out of the kitchen. The latter continued to plead with Benjamin to be allowed back in, and he finally relented on the last ticket. Winner: As per Hell's Kitchen tradition, Benjamin and Michelle stood in front of two doors. The latter's door opened, making her the 17th winner and first All-Star winner of Hell's Kitchen; the former took his defeat graciously. Michelle gave a victory speech and hung her picture in the Hall of Fame. In the final credits scene, Nick stated he was proud of her for winning, Elise cried openly over losing to Michelle and Van asked Marino for a "real drink" as opposed to the standard champagne. Ramsay's comment: "Having the youngest of all-stars step up and win this competition is a testament to Michelle's talent. At a very young age, she has already proven she is driven, creative, and commanding. She will be a great asset to Hell's Kitchen in Las Vegas."

== U.S. Nielsen ratings ==
No.	Episode	Air date	Timeslot (ET)	Rating/Share (18–49)		Viewers (millions)	Nightly rank
1	"All-Stars Arrive"	September 29, 2017	Friday 8:00 p.m.	0.9	4	3.02	3
2	"Raising the Bar"	October 6, 2017	Friday 8:00 p.m.	0.9	4	2.80	3
3	"Tower of Terror"	October 13, 2017	Friday 8:00 p.m.	0.8	4	2.87	3
4	"Just Letter Cook"	October 20, 2017	Friday 8:00 p.m.	0.8	4	2.86	3
5	"Josh Josh Josh"	November 3, 2017	Friday 8:00 p.m.	0.8	4	3.10	3
6	"A Little Slice of Hell"	November 10, 2017	Friday 8:00 p.m.	0.8	4	3.11	4
7	"Trimming Fat"	November 17, 2017	Friday 8:00 p.m.	0.9	4	3.21	2
8	"Welcome to the Jungle"	December 1, 2017	Friday 8:00 p.m.	0.7	3	2.80	3
9	"Catch of the Day"	December 8, 2017	Friday 8:00 p.m.	0.8	3	2.96	3
10	"It's All Gravy"	December 15, 2017	Friday 8:00 p.m.	0.8	4	3.04	2
11	"Trying to Pasta Test"	January 5, 2018	Friday 8:00 p.m.	0.9	4	3.42	3
12	"Five is the New Black"	January 12, 2018	Friday 8:00 p.m.	1.1	5	3.56	1
13	"Stars Heating Up Hell"	January 19, 2018	Friday 8:00 p.m.	0.9	4	3.17	2
14	"Families Come to Hell"	January 26, 2018	Friday 8:00 p.m.	0.9	4	3.43	1
15	"Final Three"	February 2, 2018	Friday 8:00 p.m.	0.9	4	3.36	2
16	"All-Star Finale"	February 2, 2018	Friday 8:00 p.m.	0.9	4	3.36	2
