= Scott A. Williams =

American screenwriter

- Born: Yonkers, New York
- Occupations: Television writer, producer
- Spouse: Catherine Curry-Williams (m. 1996)
- Children: 2 (1 deceased)
- Writing career
- Notable works: Third Watch; Bones; Castle; NCIS

Scott A. Williams is an American television writer and producer, as well as co-founder of Shane's Inspiration, a non-profit that builds playgrounds for kids of ALL abilities. Scott has worked on the NBC crime dramas Brooklyn South and Third Watch. He worked as a co-executive producer and writer for the Fox police procedural Bones from 2006 to 2009. He was nominated for an Edgar Award for his work on the series Brooklyn South. He is now a writer and executive producer on NCIS.

== Early life ==
Scott was born and raised in Yonkers, New York, graduated Gorton High School and received a BA in English from Cortland State (State University of New York College at Cortland).

== Career ==
=== 1990s ===
After years as a bartender in NYC and Los Angeles, Williams' writing career began in 1994, writing unproduced screenplays for the likes of Ron Howard, Kevin Costner, and Ray Liotta. Williams began working in television as a writer for the CBS police drama Brooklyn South in 1997. The series was created by Steven Bochco, William M. Finkelstein, David Milch, and retired police officer Bill Clark. Bochco, Finkelstein and Milch served as executive producers for the series along with Michael S. Chernuchin. The show focused on a single precinct of patrol officers in New York. Williams wrote the teleplays for the episodes "Clown Without Pity" (based on a story from Clark and Milch), "Love Hurts" (with Finkelstein; based on a story by Clark, Milch and Bochco), "Fisticuffs" (with retired Chicago police officer Edward Allen Bernero; based on a story by Finkelstein, Clark, and Milch), and "Fools Russian" (with Allen Edwards and Matt Olmstead from a story by Bochco, Clark, Finkelstein, and Milch). Williams also contributed to four episodes as a writer. The series was eventually canceled after completing a 22-episode season. Williams and his co-writers were nominated for an Edgar Award for Best Episode in a TV Series in 1999 for their work on "Fools Russian".

Williams also worked as a writer for the ABC drama NYPD Blue in 1998. The series was created by Milch and Bochco and focused on a single unit of homicide detectives in New York. Williams wrote the fifth-season finale "Honeymoon at Viagra Falls".

Williams became an executive story editor for the series Brimstone in 1999. The series followed a dead police detective whose mission (assigned by the Devil) is to return to Hell 113 spirits who have escaped to Earth. He wrote the episode "Encore". The series was canceled midway through its first season.

=== 2000s ===
Williams was a co-producer and writer for the series Cover Me: Based on the True Life of an FBI Family in 2000. The series was a comedy-drama that focused on an undercover FBI agent and his family. Williams wrote the episode "Where Have You Gone, Sandy Koufax?" The series was canceled after airing only four episodes. He became a co-producer and writer for the first season of The District later in 2000 following the cancellation of Cover Me. The show followed the work and personal life of the chief of Washington, D.C.'s Police Department played by Craig T. Nelson. Williams wrote the episodes "The Santa Wars", "Vigilante", and "Fools Russian: Part 1". The "Fools Russian" two-part episode was the season finale and marked the second time Williams had used the pun as a title (after Brooklyn South).

In 2001, he co-wrote the screenplay for the film The Unsaid with Miguel Tejada-Flores based on a story by Christopher Murphey. The film follows a psychiatrist (played by Andy García) who is struggling to cope with his son's suicide and his attempts to rehabilitate a patient who reminds him of his son.

In the fall of 2001, he joined the crew of the NBC emergency services drama Third Watch as a writer and producer for the series' third season. The series was co-created by his Brooklyn South colleague Edward Allen Bernero alongside producer John Wells. The show focused on the police, firefighters, and paramedics who worked the same shift in an area of New York. Williams wrote five episodes for the third season. He began writing alongside Bernero on "The Relay"; he next worked with other series creator Wells on "Adam 55-3"; he wrote his first solo episode "Act Brave" next. He was promoted to supervising producer mid-season. After the mid-season break he wrote two further episodes "Cold Front" and "The Unforgiven" (co-written with Jorge Zamacona and Julie Hébert). After the mid-season break, he wrote two further episodes "Cold Front" and "The Unforgiven". Williams returned as a supervising producer for the fourth season in 2002. He wrote five episodes for the fourth season; "The Chosen Few", "Firestarter", "Snow Blind", "Last Call" (his second collaboration with Bernero), and "Closing In". He was promoted to co-executive producer for the fifth season in 2003. He wrote four episodes for the fifth season; "My Opening Farewell", "Surrender", "Blessed and Bewildered", and "Higher Calling". Williams left the crew at the end of the fifth season. He wrote fourteen episodes for the series in total.

He joined the crew of legal drama Crossing Jordan as a co-executive producer and writer for the fourth season in 2004. The series followed a medical examiner's cases. Williams wrote or co-wrote five episodes for the season. He wrote the season premiere "After Dark", "Skin and Bone", and "Fire in the Sky" (with the series creator and executive producer Tim Kring). He also co-wrote the teleplay for the episode "Blue Moon" with Jon Cowan and Robert L. Rowner from a story by Kring and Linda Gase. He co-wrote the story for the episode with Kring and Steve Valentine and co-wrote the teleplay with Kring. Williams left the series at the end of the fourth season.

Williams was hired as a co-executive producer and writer for the fourth season of Without a Trace in 2005. The show focuses on an FBI unit who specialise in missing persons cases. He wrote three episodes for the season; "Viuda Negra", "Rage", and "More Than This". Williams left the series at the end of the fourth season.

Also in 2005, he co-created the series Ice Diaries with Dan Marinelli. The series was a documentary that followed Olympic hopeful skaters through the 2005–2006 season. Williams served as an executive producer for the project which aired in 2006.

He became a co-executive producer and writer for the second season of Bones in 2006. He wrote the episodes "The Truth in the Lye" and "The Girl in the Gator" for the second season. He remained a co-executive producer for the third season in 2007 and wrote the episodes "Mummy in the Maze" and "The Santa in the Slush". He returned as a co-executive producer for the fourth season in 2008 and wrote the season opener "Yanks in the U.K.: Parts 1 and 2" and the episodes "Fire in the Ice" and "The Beaver in the Otter". Williams left the series at the end of the fourth season.

=== 2010s ===
He became a co-executive producer for the drama series Miami Medical which aired as a mid-season replacement in 2010. Later that year, he joined the ABC procedural Castle for its third season as a co-exec, writing the episodes "Last Call" and "A Slice of Death", before joining NCIS. Frequently cited as the most watched show worldwide, NCIS celebrates its 400th episode this season. Since joining the show season 9 (2011), Williams has written 30-plus episodes, including fan favorites "Seek," "Family First," "Keep Going," "What Child Is This?" and "Lost Time."

Williams appeared in the tenth episode of the seventeenth season of the reality competition series Hell's Kitchen where his charity Shane's Inspiration had their dinner cooked by the Blue Team during a private service.

== Personal life ==
In 1997, Scott and his wife Catherine Curry-Williams had a child who was born with Spinal Muscular Atrophy (SMA type 2). The child died at two weeks old. Following this, Scott and Catherine become co-founders (along with friend Tiffany Harris) of Shane's Inspiration, a non-profit dedicated to fostering a bias-free world for children with disabilities through the creation of inclusive playgrounds and programs. As of 2020, its helped to create 70-plus playgrounds around the world, while providing educational programs that promote inclusion, kindness and compassion. Scott also serves as president of the Advisory Board for WeSPARK, a Los Angeles-based non-profit that provides free services to cancer patients and their families.
