= Mark Currie =

Mark Currie may refer to:

- Mark John Currie (1795–1874), English admiral, explorer and early Western Australia settler
- Mark Currie, designer of 2005 American video game Trash
- Mark Currie (cricketer) (born 1979), English right-handed batsman

== See also ==
- Mark Curry (disambiguation)
