= Michael Currie =

Michael Currie may refer to:

- Michael Currie (actor) (1928–2009), American actor
- Michael Currie (politician) (born 1955), Canadian politician
- Michael Currie (footballer) (born 1979), English footballer

== See also ==
- Michael Curry (disambiguation)
