= Esmé Currey =

British artist

- Born: 1881; Kensington, London, England
- Died: 1973 (aged 92)
- Education: Slade School of Fine Art; Goldsmiths' College
- Known for: Painting, printmaking

Esmé Mary Evelyn Currey (March 1881 – June 1973) was a British artist, known for her printmaking and for her paintings.

== Biography ==
Currey was born at Kensington in London and was privately educated both there and in Dresden after which she returned to London to study at the Slade School of Fine Art. She then studied with the artist Max Meldrum at Melbourne in Australia, before studying engraving at Goldsmiths' College in London. Currey established a studio in London and produced images, often of landscapes and architecture, in pencil, as etchings and as paintings in tempera. She exhibited at a wide variety of venues, notably at the Royal Academy in London between 1910 and 1949 and also with the Society of British Artists, the Royal Society of Painter-Etchers and Engravers, the Royal Hibernian Academy, the Senefelder Club and the United Artists group. In 1929 she exhibited at the Paris Salon. The British Museum in London holds two prints by Currey in its permanent collection.
