= Dave Currey (environmentalist) =

British environmentalist and photographer

Dave Currey (born 1953) is a British environmentalist, writer and photographer. A minister's son, he was born in Sussex in the UK and brought up in London. He gained a BA in Photographic Arts in 1976 following a passion in communicating visually. In 1976, following another passion, he walked 1,000 miles across Oregon, Idaho and Wyoming to help raise awareness of conservation issues for the World Wildlife Fund. On this journey his photographs, radio and television interviews were his introduction to a world of media co-operation that would steer his next thirty years in environmental activism.

In 1979 he volunteered as a photographer on board the Greenpeace ship Rainbow Warrior during its Icelandic anti-whaling campaign where he first met Allan Thornton, Greenpeace's director at the time. In 1983, while he was working in public relations photography and teaching, Thornton persuaded him to join another anti-whaling ship, "Balaenoptera". With Jennifer Lonsdale, another Greenpeace veteran, they carried out undercover work in the Norwegian port of Vado, posing as journalists to gain entry to whaling factories. They were able to truthfully insist they were not working for Greenpeace as the factory workers feared, but knew it was unwise to state they were on an independent environmental activist ship. The campaign was incredibly successful resulting in a two-thirds reduction in whaling quotas and huge embarrassment for the Norwegian government.

From 1978 to 1986 he often contributed to Wildlife magazine and later when it became BBC Wildlife, for a while being their "roving naturalist" to places such as the Everglades National Park, Yellowstone National Park, and Baja California, Mexico. He also acted as a book and television reviewer for the magazine. His nature photography was widely used during this period and he was described as "one of the new breed of naturalist photographers, with a commitment to conservation and the style of a photojournalist."

== The Environmental Investigation Agency ==
In 1984 he travelled to the Danish Faroe Islands with Jennifer Lonsdale (née Gibson) to document the world's largest whale kill – at that time over 2000 pilot whales. On return, together with Allan Thornton they established and became directors of the Environmental Investigation Agency (EIA). They believed there was room for an organisation that gathered documentary evidence of issues which would form the basis of a campaign as well as provide materials for the media.

Throughout most of EIA's history he acted as its senior investigator operating undercover all over the world.

He started as EIA's campaigns director and when Thornton briefly returned to Greenpeace in 1986, took over as executive director until 1995. During this time he fronted many campaigns, co-authoring an account of the ivory investigation with Allan Thornton in their book "To Save An Elephant". After 1995 he remained on the board and on staff and concentrated on building new campaigns, most notably to protect the Indian tiger (1995–1999) and then rainforests in Indonesia (1999–2007).

He was awarded the Albert Schweitzer Medal by the Animal Welfare Institute with Allan Thornton in 1990 for their work protecting elephants and dolphins. EIA was awarded the Global 500 Roll of Honor by UNEP for "outstanding contributions to the protection of the environment" in 2001.

== Working undercover ==
Since the investigation in Vado in 1983 he has led teams all over the world. His teams' findings include uncovering wild primates smuggled to British laboratories from Gambia, massive mortalities in wild birds caught for pets in Senegal. From 1987 to 1989 he was undercover in Dubai and Ajman (UAE), Tanzania, Kenya, Singapore and Hong Kong posing as a journalist, photographer, tourist or ivory dealer. His work helped uncover the trade routes and dealers in poached ivory. In 1987 he was famously hoisted, with cameraman Clive Lonsdale, on a forklift truck crane to the top shelf of a warehouse in Dubai to photograph the neighbouring unit. Through a small hole cut in the cardboard packing case they filmed for 45 minutes the poached ivory being worked in the Poon brothers clandestine ivory factory. The documentation proved crucial in unravelling the ivory pipeline and EIA's successful launch of a campaign for an international ivory ban achieved in 1989.

His undercover experiences span twenty five years. For instance he has been stopped by the South African Police wanting the name of an informant he could not divulge. In Guyana and Senegal he can no longer operate undercover, having been threatened in the former with a gun. During the ivory investigations he was checking his car for bombs after credible warnings. He has stated that it can get dangerous, especially with multiple covers when working in the same country but he has a strong sense when to get out of a bad situation.

== Whaling ==
He has witnessed and photographed the killing of fin whales in Iceland minke whales in Norway and hundreds of pilot whales and dolphins in the Danish Faroe Islands. He investigated the killing of dall's porpoise in their tens of thousands in Japan. In his role for EIA he has attended the International Whaling Commission (IWC) meetings as a delegate, had his photographs published widely and written numerous reports.

At one IWC meeting in 1990 EIA needed a resolution on small whales and dolphins to be proposed but sought a country to do this. When he heard the UK Ministry of Agriculture, Fisheries and Food was due to appear on television just before him, he let the UK know. It made the difference and the UK, wishing to look good on television proposed the resolution. Currey was able to praise the move.

== Elephants and the ivory trade ==
In 1989 Currey, using his considerable first-hand knowledge of the international ivory trade, took Desmond Hamill, senior foreign correspondent with Independent Television News (ITN), to Tanzania and the UAE. They filmed the ivory room in Dar es Salaam, Tanzania and flew to Selous Game Reserve to film anti-poaching units in the field. In the UAE they confronted one of the ivory dealers, George Poon, outside his secret Ajman factory. The first time he had been filmed. ITN put together three News Specials broadcast on 10, 11 and 12 May 1989 which had a powerful impact on the public, the UK government and other organisations. This was the perfect launch to EIA's campaign for an ivory ban achieved later the same year after the release of an explosive report, by Currey and Thornton, packed with evidence of the international ivory trade: naming names, describing routes, quoting dealers from hidden recordings and blowing apart many of the pro-trade arguments with documented evidence.

When attempts to reverse the ban were clearly to be made, Currey travelled with a companion to Zimbabwe in November 1991, the pro-trade's main proponent. They uncovered corruption, illegal trade and the brutal death of Capt Nleya, a Zimbabwe National Army (ZNA) officer who had reported poaching, smuggling and cattle rustling by the ZNA in Mozambique and along the Zimbabwe border, to the Under Secretary in the Defence Ministry. A hand-written note on 4 January 1989 from Capt Nleya to his wife, photographed by Currey as evidence, alleged he had been "collected by Special Investigations Branch and Central Intelligence Organisation (CIO) members.... Foul play is expected.... " On 12 March his decomposed body was found under a tree behind Hwange army barracks. A rope was hanging over a branch above his corpse. The next day CIO officers came to see his wife at her home and threatened to kill his brothers. On 14 March 1989 she was informed his body had been found. They uncovered other suspicious deaths of officials who attempted to expose the ZNA's involvement in elephant and rhino poaching. Currey and his companion were followed during this investigation.

He co-authored a report on the success of the ivory ban in 1994.

Currey has represented EIA as a delegate at the Convention on International Trade in Endangered Species of Wild Flora and Fauna (CITES) on a number of occasions.

In 2015 he started blogging, most notably on the renewed poaching crisis for African elephants and the ivory trade.

== The wild bird trade ==
He has investigated the trade in wild-caught birds for pets in Argentina, Bolivia, Côte d'Ivoire, Ghana, Guyana, and Senegal. He was central to co-operation between EIA, the Royal Society for the Protection of Birds (RSPB) and the Royal Society for the Prevention of Cruelty to Animals (RSPCA) in a joint campaign to ban the wild bird trade. EIA's provision of evidence and startling photographs and film footage, and his personal experience in the field, gave him an important role with these much larger organisations.

He led an investigations team in Senegal in 1986 which uncovered every stage of the trade, from capture to export, in the exporting country. Senegal was the world's biggest exporter of wild-caught birds. They estimated 20 million wild birds were caught annually for the export trade, 50% dying before export. Once the air transport and quarantine mortalities were considered, they estimated four out of five wild-caught birds died before sale to the public. The footage and photographs were used widely around the world and formed the basis of EIA's and other organisations' campaigns for years to come.

In November 1991 to promote the bird campaign and shoot new material for a National Geographic documentary, he led a three-person team to Argentina. They documented the trail of capture to export of the blue-fronted amazon parrot. It revealed extreme cruelty, illegality, conservation failures and high unreported mortalities. Within a year of the film showing, the Argentinian quota was set to zero. Further parrot trade was uncovered by Currey leading the same team in Ghana and Côte d'Ivoire in West Africa. Co-operating with the Ghanaian authorities they tracked grey parrots caught illegally in Ghana being moved to neighbouring Côte d'Ivoire where they were "legalised" by corrupt officials for export. This investigation became part of a television documentary shown all over the world and additionally resulted in the arrest, set up by Currey and his team, of a Ghanaian parrot dealer in the capital Accra.

One of the greatest successes of the EIA wild-caught bird campaign was persuading over 70 airlines to voluntarily stop carrying wild birds.

== Indian tiger conservation ==
Currey carried out an in depth research trip to India in 1995, meeting conservationists, government officials, villagers and assessing if EIA could have a useful role in tiger conservation. The government was in denial over poaching, some wildlife wardens denied poaching to save face, conservationists and indigenous groups quarrelled. With strong advice from a group of trusted wildlife experts he put EIA's international campaign at the forefront of forcing government to face its failures and reconvene the Indian Board for Wildlife, chaired by the Prime Minister which had not met for eight years.

In October 1996 Currey launched a new EIA report in London, Delhi, Mumbai, Bangalore and Kolkata with a hard hitting video public service announcement and video news release. "The Political Wilderness" report re-emerged in the media in different ways for over a year and helped revitalise discussion on tiger conservation in India. The Indian Board for Wildlife was reconvened.

Whilst researching the report, Currey was taken to the Indian state of Assam by Sanjay Deb Roy, a former chief wildlife warden for Assam and later, for India. He had retired but was still active and the two men became friends. Deb Roy took Currey to Manas Tiger Reserve where armed insurgents had closed the park. Poachers moved relatively freely. Deb Roy had been instrumental in setting up this reserve while chief wildlife warden. In Kaziranga the situation was different. Brave forest guards risked their lives to protect tigers and one-horned rhinoceros from heavily armed poachers. But they needed equipment, salaries and uniforms.

Currey's photographic skills documented the plight of Kaziranga National Park and illustrated the problems faced in Assam in a hard-hitting article in the UK's Daily Telegraph Magazine. EIA launched an appeal guaranteeing that everything raised would be spent on the park. Through this appeal EIA spent over £80,000 on essentials and boosted staff morale.

The campaign continued with a further report published to identify the problems for tigers in the Indian State of Madhya Pradesh following research in the state. Currey stood back after this to let his colleague, Debbie Banks, continue the work.

== The timber trade and orang-utans ==
In 1998 Currey led a team to Indonesia to document illegal logging and assess EIA's international role. They met with many local and national NGOs and struck up a close relationship with Telapak who they continue to work in partnership. They travelled to Kalimantan where forest fires were raging and a million hectares of forest was being destroyed in a misguided government scheme to grow rice on acidic peat. They revealed it was an excuse to gain timber and lucrative construction contracts, so prevalent at that time.

With his team Currey decided to focus the campaign on the destruction of Tanjung Puting National Park in Central Kalimantan and Gunung Leuser National Park in Sumatra, both vital orang-utan habitat. The high-profile species assisted in communicating the problems of commercial illegal logging. He visited both places, helped film and photograph illegal logging, as well as undercover work in Kalimantan to identify the head of the timber mafia. It was a difficult time with one staff member of Telapak and one from EIA being kidnapped while investigating the timber baron Abdul Rasyid. Currey oversaw the rescue mission devoting tens of thousands of dollars of campaign funds to get them safely out of Kalimantan.

The kidnap gave EIA and Telapak publicity on which they built their campaign, successfully pushing through a ban on Indonesian ramin timber species, a main target for Rasyid's empire, and reaching powerful figures in the Indonesian government, including its president. Perhaps the most significant move came in 2001 in Bali when governments gathered and, in the wake of the 9/11 attack the same week, agreed the Bali Declaration to renew efforts to protect forests. Currey and his team had been important catalysts to this change in international direction and although most governments did not live up to their agreement it provided a springboard to unilateral action in the US, the UK, Japan, the European Union and exporting countries such as Indonesia. Currey helped his team build strong and close relationships with local NGOs by securing grants for their participation from the UK's Department for International Development and the EU.

== Other campaigns ==
As executive director of EIA up to 1995 (and board member afterwards) Currey has been involved in most EIA campaigns. This includes marine turtle conservation in Sri Lanka, a ban on ozone-depleting substances, the environmental threats to whales and dolphins and a campaign to stop the use of rhinoceros horn in Taiwan.

== Visual training for activists ==
In 1998 when Currey returned from witnessing the forest fires in Borneo and working with local NGOs he developed an EIA programme, with a donor's support, to train local activists in the use of cameras and video. He helped develop this by securing a grant from the UK's Department for International Development. This pioneering work has empowered over 100 Indonesian NGOs in the use of visual evidence in campaigning. It also enabled a local environmental radio station to stay on air after its aerial was hit by lightning as well as the setup of a television station in Sulawesi.

This training has since developed into one of EIA's core programmes.

== Documentary films and other media ==
In his role as EIA's spokesperson for two decades Currey has fronted dozens of press conferences and been interviewed hundreds of times on television, radio and for newspapers. His undercover background has sometimes provided comical copy such as "They giggled, kissed and held hands just like any other honeymoon couple. But each night they slept back to back. For Dave Currey and Lydia Swart were no ordinary newlyweds. They were ecodetectives...." He has even been immortalised in a cartoon showing his confrontation with ivory trader Mr Poon.

Besides using his professional photographic skills, Currey has filmed a great deal of video for EIA and commercial productions. He has also co-produced seven film documentaries shown on prime time British television (ITV) as the series Animal Detectives. Each programme showed EIA undercover operations on a particular species. Currey led four teams in the series and it boosted all the campaigns. In particular, the film on marine turtle (tortoise-shell) smuggling from the Maldives to Sri Lanka brought quick arrests and enforcement, helping to protect the hawksbill turtle in the region.

This series produced with Paul Cleary and Goldhawk Media won a British Environment and Media Award for best film, the Brigitte Bardot International Genesis Award (Los Angeles), and the Gold Plaque at the Chicago Documentary Film Festival. Currey appeared on Discovery Channel in the US making a speech when receiving the Genesis Award.

Animal Detectives was also shown on Animal Planet Channel. Two other television series benefited from the footage and investigations carried out by Currey and his crew. They are Wildlife Detectives produced by Murphy Entertainment and shown throughout the world and a three part series on Germany's RTL2 channel.

He also co-produced and wrote (with Allan Thornton) a film Let Them Live about EIA broadcast by the BBC in the UK.

Currey's friendship with Paul Cleary from Goldhawk Media with whom Animal Detectives was made had previously resulted in three other major documentaries made with EIA's full co-operation with Currey taking the lead EIA role. They were two National Geographic Voyager series films Dead on Arrival and Wildlife Detectives and a BBC Nature Special Whale Wars.

In addition two films were made entirely around Currey: Deadline 2000 and A New World

Currey appears as one of the investigators in a film broadcast in 2011 on Nat Geo Wild in the US and UK and other territories called Blood Ivory Smugglers.

== Photography and writing ==
His photographic professionalism has provided EIA with considerable media opportunities. The most notable photo spreads using his images have appeared in the Sunday Times Magazine, The Telegraph Magazine, and Life magazine.

His photographs have also illustrated articles (linked to EIA campaigns) he has written for magazines including World magazine, Country Life magazine, BBC Wildlife and The Scotsman magazine.

In addition to writing and co-writing a plethora of reports over years, Currey has contributed to many newspapers and magazines. He co-authored "To Save An Elephant" about EIA's undercover and campaign work to obtain the ivory ban in 1989. This book, translated into Japanese, German and Russian, was described as "A savage indictment of an obscene trade" by BBC Wildlife Magazine

He has recently set up a publishing imprint, Wild Press, with his long-term (since 1978) civil partner Gary Hodges. They have so far published "Drawn to the Soul", a book of Hodges' wildlife art coinciding with his 2010 retrospective show. The second book is a novel set in Borneo written by Currey called "Stripped". Published in paperback and as a download this eco-thriller draws on Currey's experiences in Indonesia opposing the timber Mafia. It is unusual in that it authentically builds its plot around the destruction of the rainforest with a central gay character. It has been described as a "completely new style of eco-thriller".

In April 2014 Wild Press published Gary Hodges' book "Heart & Soul" an autobiography illustrated throughout with photographs and a portfolio of all his published drawings. Also in 2014 Wild Press published Currey's "Galapagos Photography - practical photo advice for visitors" described as a beautiful and practical photography guide for visitors to the Galapagos Islands. Packed full of invaluable photographic advice island by island, above water and below.

In 2015 he launched a new website showcasing his photographs and starting a regular blog, mainly aimed at wildlife and environmental issues.
