= Senator Curry =

Senator Curry may refer to:

- Bill Curry (politician) (born 1951), Connecticut State Senate
- Chip Curry (fl. 2020s), Maine State Senate
- Edward V. Curry (1909–1982), New York State Senate
- Ulysses Currie (1935–2019), Maryland State Senate
