= Mark Curry =

Mark or Markus Curry may refer to:

- Mark Curry (American actor) (born 1961), comedian and TV host
- Mark Curry (British TV presenter) (born 1961), TV and film actor
- Mark Curry (rapper) (born 1971), American rapper
- Mark Curry (rock musician), American singer-songwriter since 1990s
- Markus Curry (born 1981), American football cornerback during 2000s

== See also ==
- Mark Currie (disambiguation)
