= Tyler Curry =

American LGBT activist and columnist

- Born: September 23, 1983 (age 43); Conroe, Texas
- Citizenship: United States
- Education: Arizona State University
- Occupations: HIV Equal Senior editor; Columnist; LGBT activist
- Board member of: Dallas Red Foundation

Tyler Curry (born September 23, 1983) is an American LGBT activist and columnist. He is the editor-at-large for HIV Plus, a contributing editor of The Advocate, and the creator the Needle Prick Project. The Needle Prick Project is "an editorial campaign to elicit a candid and open conversation on what it means to be HIV positive today".

Curry is a freelance columnist and fiction writer for online publications such as The Huffington Post, Volttage Buzz, and Instinct. In August 2014, Curry was named as one of HIV Plus Magazine's '20 Amazing HIV-Positive Men of 2014'.

== Advocacy ==
A Dallas, Texas resident, Curry is on the board of the Dallas Red Foundation, "a nonprofit organization focused on providing financial support to organizations in the North Texas area that serve individuals affected by HIV/AIDS."

Curry is a senior editor and head writer at HIV Equal Online, an online magazine described as "an international multimedia campaign that aims to end HIV stigma and promote HIV testing by creating a social art movement that changes the way people think about HIV and which reopens the national dialogue about HIV." Curry's role includes publishing editorial content for the website and working with freelance writers.

A gay man who is open about his HIV-positive status, Curry is a proponent of others who are HIV-positive addressing and owning their status, stating, "HIV isn't a character flaw, it is a reality that someone either understands or they do not." Stemming from that belief, Curry created The Needle Prick Project (TNPP) as an opening to discussions on what being HIV-positive means in today's world. As an editorial and education campaign, TNPP works for the fight against discrimination against people with HIV/AIDS. On the receiving end of discrimination due to HIV, Curry was not allowed back into South Korea after teaching English for a year. South Korea had a policy of not issuing work permits for people that have HIV, but that policy has since been amended.

In 2015, Curry released the children's book A Peacock Among Pigeons, illustrated by Clarione Gutierrez. The book was awarded The Enchanted Page Book Award in 2016 by the Literary Classics website and was turned into a musical, with score and lyrics written by composer John Bucchino

Curry supports Beat AIDS Project Zimbabwe, a group dedicated to combating HIV/AIDS in Zimbabwe.

== Bibliography ==
- Curry, Tyler. A Peacock Among Pigeons (2015). ISBN 978-1631773259
