= Michael Curry =

Michael Curry may refer to:

- Michael Curry (basketball) (born 1968), American basketball player and coach
- Michael Curry (bishop) (born 1953), Presiding Bishop of the Episcopal Church
- Michael Curry (puppet designer) (born 1967), American production designer
- Michael Curry (rugby union) (born 1994), New Zealand rugby union player
- Mickey Curry (born 1956), American drummer

== See also ==
- Michael Currie (disambiguation)
