= Shane's Inspiration =

Accessible playgrounds (non-profit organization)

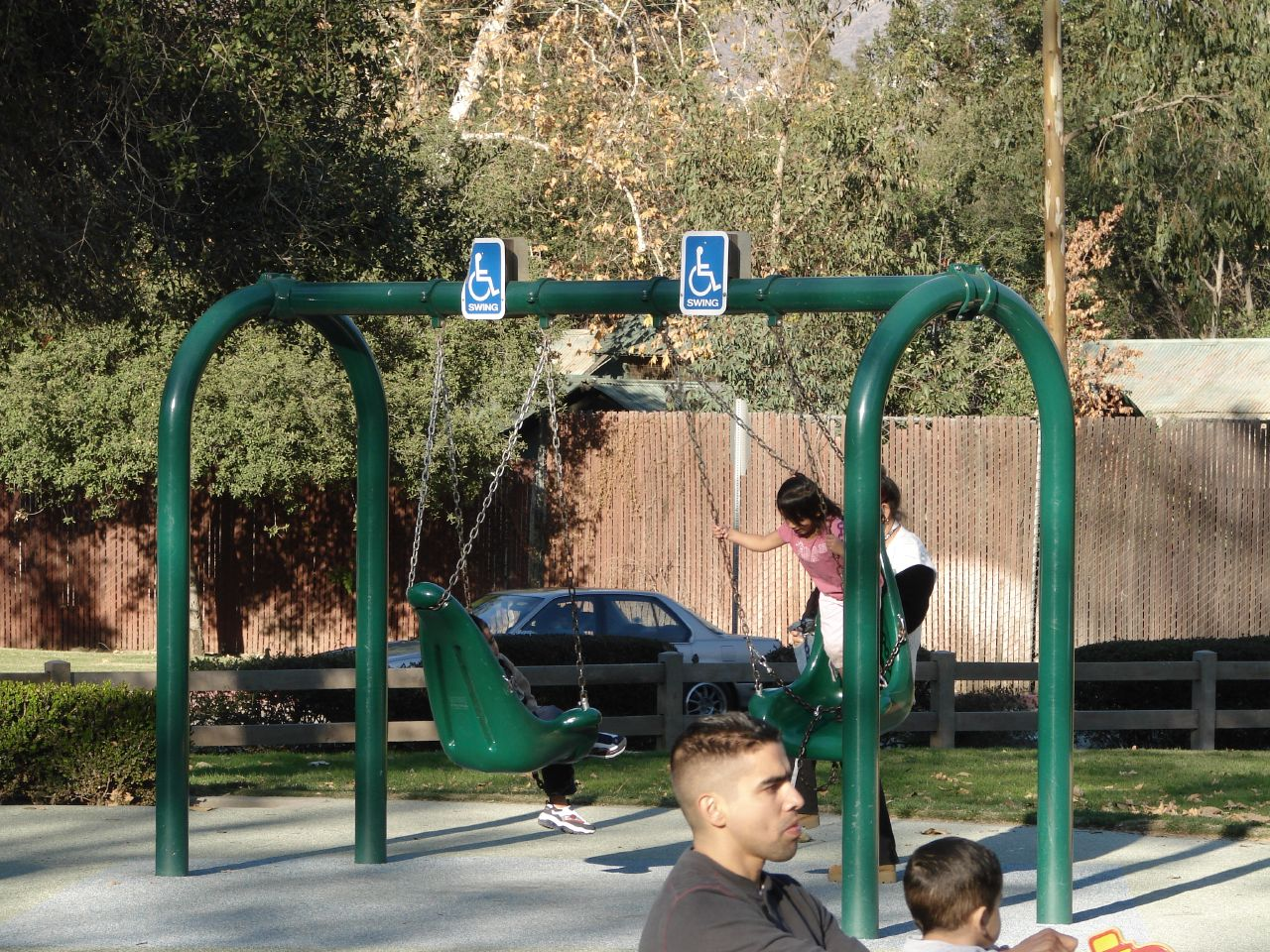
Adaptive swings at Shane's Inspiration playground in Griffith Park, Los Angeles

Shane's Inspiration is a California-based nonprofit organization that works toward creating accessible playgrounds and supporting inclusive play, through projects in the United States and abroad.

== Origins ==
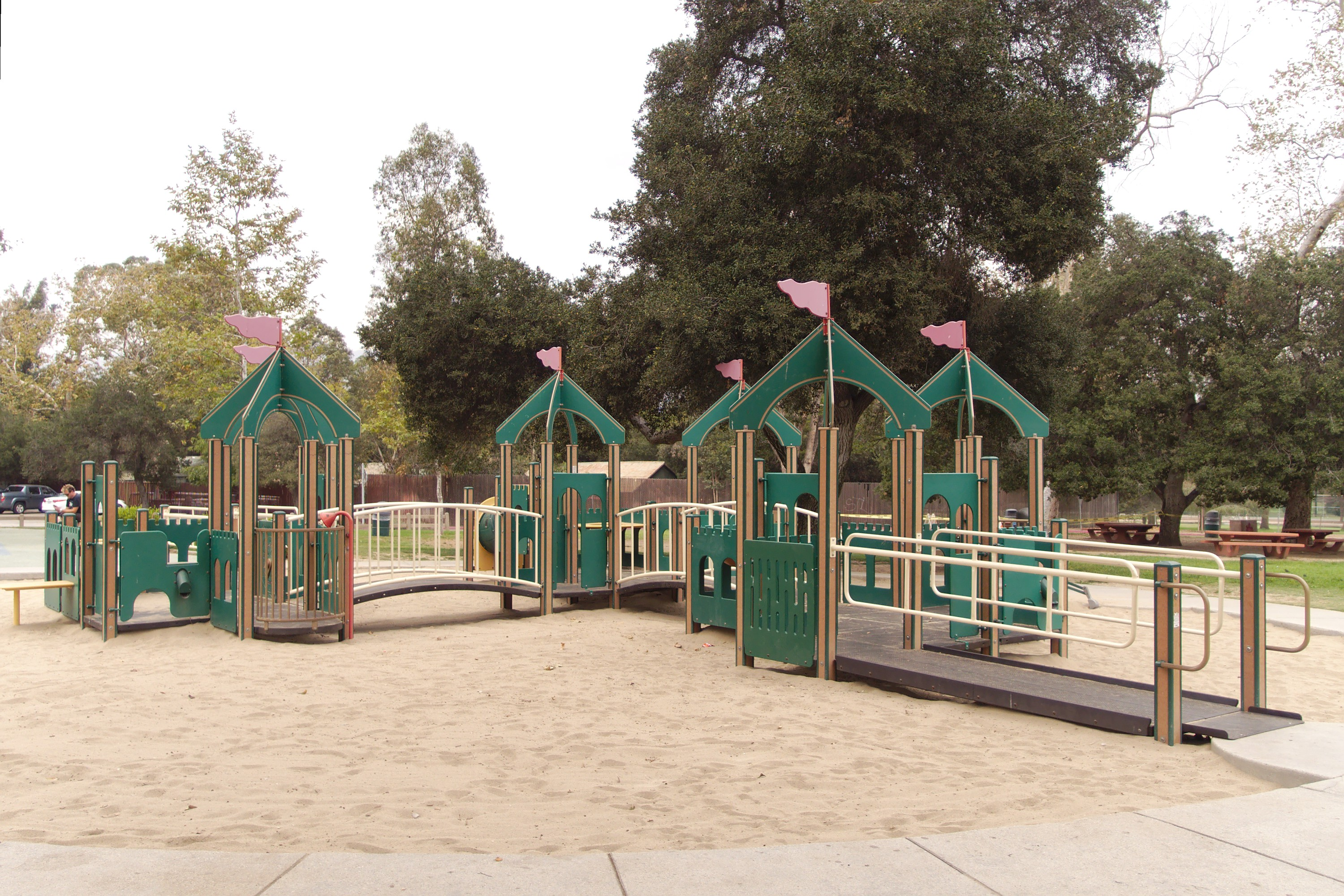
Griffith Park playground equipment with a castle theme

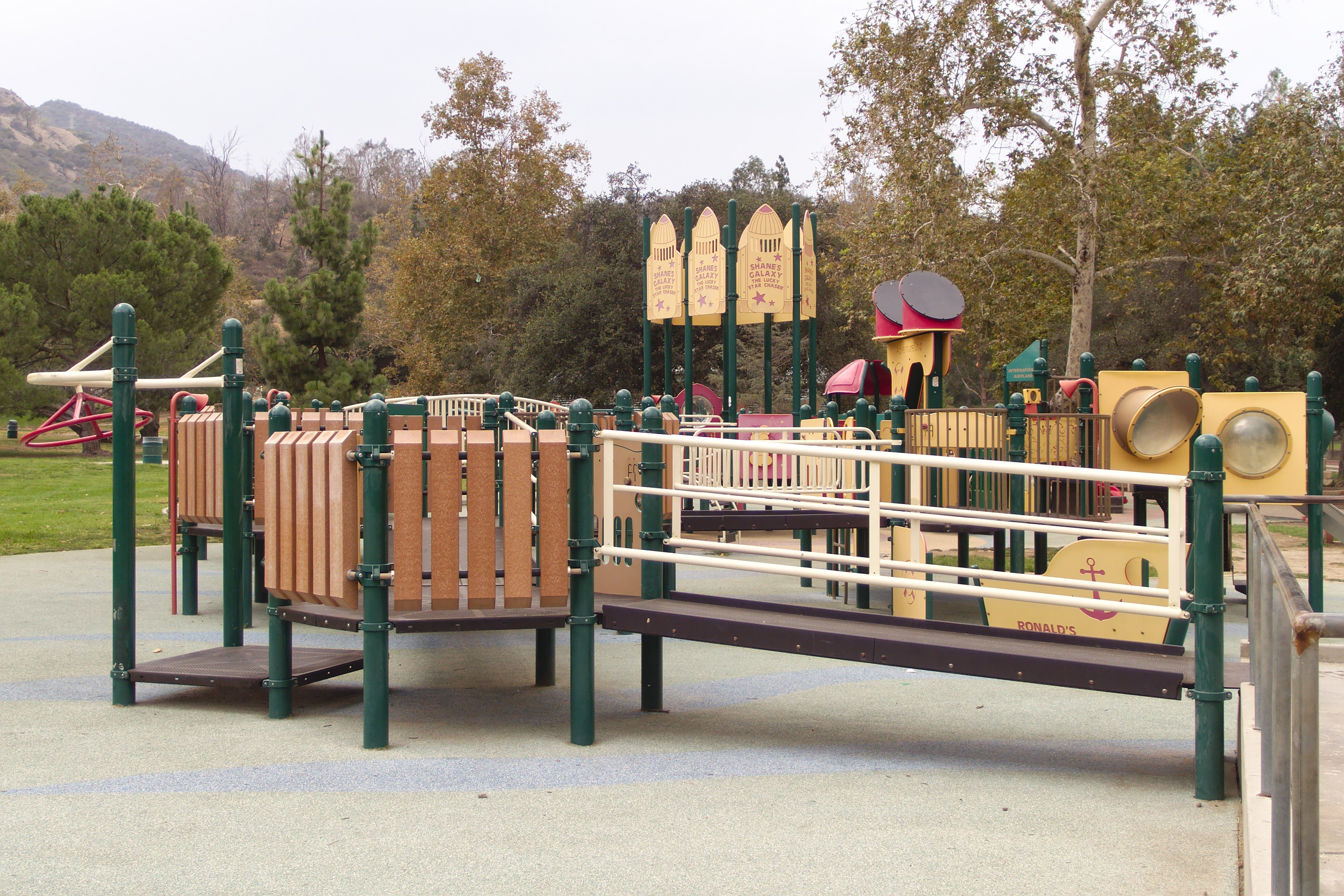
Griffith Park playground equipment with a rocket theme

Shane's Inspiration was founded in 1998, by television producer Scott A. Williams and his wife Catherine Curry-Williams, and their friend Tiffany Harris, in memory of Scott and Catherine's son Shane, who died in infancy from the effects of spinal muscular atrophy. They were inspired in part by the work of Amy Jaffe Barzach, founder of Boundless Playgrounds a few years earlier. The flagship Shane's Inspiration playground in Griffith Park opened in the autumn of 2000.

== Projects and programs ==
Since the first playground was established, more than fifty community playgrounds have followed, large and small, with involvement from Shane's Inspiration which may include help with design, sourcing materials, grant writing, working with local governments, or other steps in the process. Among their completed projects are Aidan's Place in Westwood, Brandon's Village in Calabasas, Chanticleer Park in Live Oak, SEBA Park in Elgin, Illinois, Winwood's Enchanted Playground in Hutchinson, Kansas, Fernangeles Park in Sun Valley, California, and inclusive playgrounds in Cuenca, Ecuador and Bangalore, India.

In addition to the building of physical playgrounds, Shane's Inspiration has developed curricula and social programming to sustain inclusive play at the sites it develops. Shane's Inspiration has also collaborated with Too Small to Fail and equipment manufacturer Landscape Structures Inc., to create playground signage in English and Spanish that encourages conversations between parents and children.

Fundraising activities for Shane's Inspiration include the annual "Walk and Roll" event in Griffith Park.

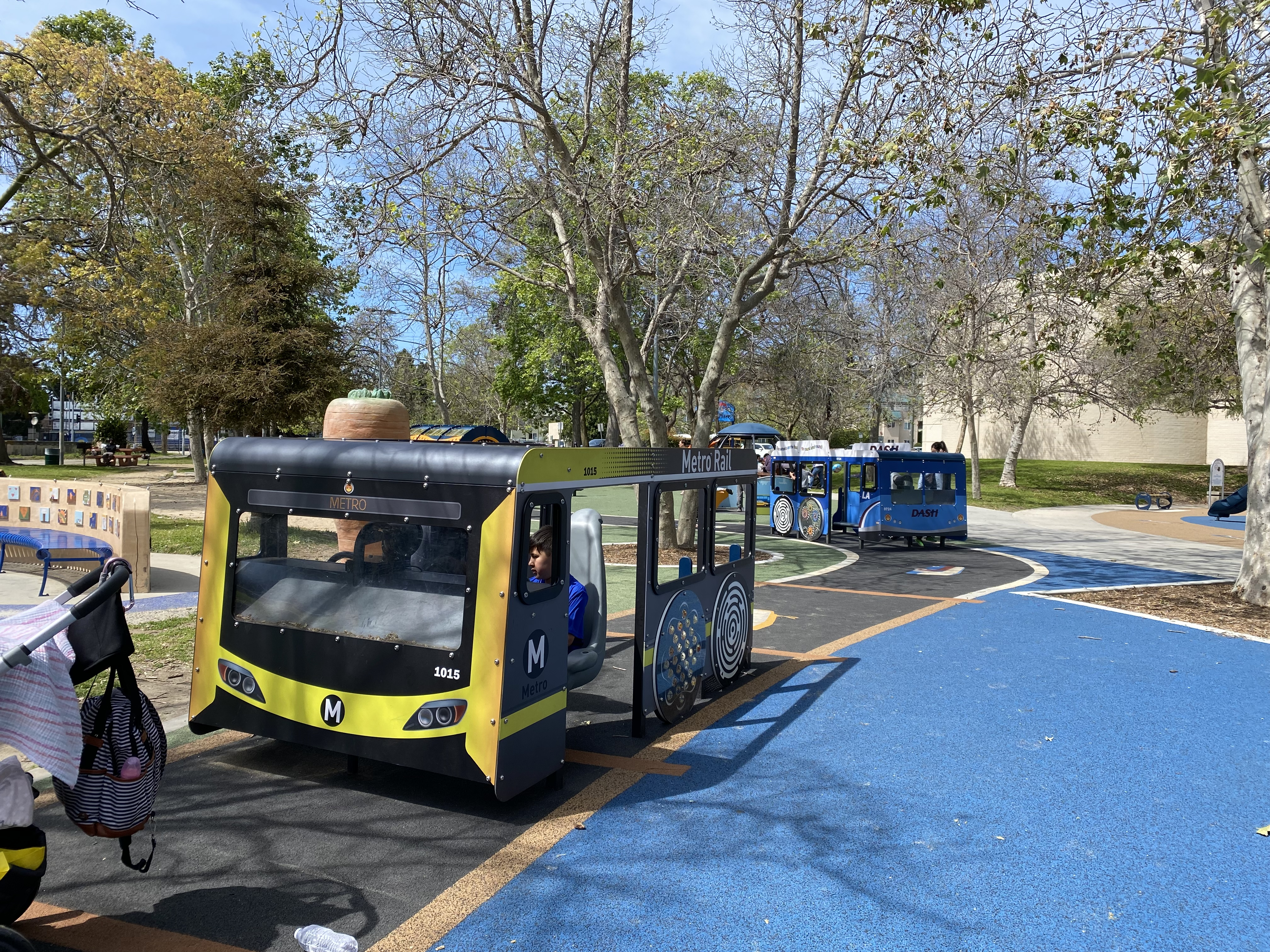
Los Angeles Metro and LADOT Dash transit-themed play equipment at Aidan's Place at Westwood Recreation Center, Los Angeles, California
