= Governor Curry =

Governor Curry may refer to:

- George Curry (politician) (1861–1947), 17th Governor of New Mexico Territory
- George Law Curry (1820–1878), 5th Governor of Oregon Territory

== See also ==
- Archibald Currie (Surinamese politician) (1888–1986), Governor-General of Suriname from 1963 to 1964
