= Simon Combes =

English painter

Simon Combes (1940 – 12 December 2004) was an artist born in Shaftesbury, England. Residing most of his life in Kenya, Combes was well known for his paintings of African wildlife and dedication to conservation.

In February 2005, the Artists For Conservation organization created a conservation award in the artist's honor.
