= Catherine Curry-Williams =

American nonprofit founder

- Catherine Curry-Williams
- Born: 1958 or 1959 (age 67–68); Brooklyn, New York
- Occupations: Non-profit founder; author
- Known for: Founder of Shane's Inspiration
- Spouse: Scott A. Williams (m. 1996)
- Children: 2

Catherine Curry-Williams (born 1958/59) is an American nonprofit founder and author. She co-founded Shane's Inspiration, a Los Angeles-based nonprofit organization that develops universally accessible playgrounds for children with and without disabilities.

Curry-Williams later co-founded the She Angels Foundation, which provides grants to nonprofit organizations supporting women and girls. She is the author of the 2024 book Philanthropy on a Shoestring: How to Make a Difference on $1.40 a Day.

== Early life and Shane's Inspiration ==
Curry-Williams was born in Brooklyn, New York, in 1958 or 1959, and later moved to Los Angeles.

Curry-Williams and her husband, television writer and producer Scott Williams, had a son, Shane Alexander Williams, in 1997. Shane was born with spinal muscular atrophy and died at two weeks old.

While preparing to raise a child with significant physical disabilities, Curry-Williams and her husband examined accessibility at public playgrounds. They found that playgrounds described as accessible could provide wheelchair access to the site without necessarily providing play equipment usable by children with mobility disabilities.

Following Shane's death, Curry-Williams and Scott Williams began developing a playground in his memory where children with and without disabilities could play together.

The City of Los Angeles allocated land in Griffith Park for the project. The first Shane's Inspiration playground opened there in September 2000. It included wheelchair-accessible ramps and bridges, modified swings, raised sand-play areas and other accessible features.

A 2001 Los Angeles Times feature reported on the playground's use by families from throughout the Los Angeles area and described it as having been created by Curry-Williams and her husband in memory of their son.

Shane's Inspiration subsequently expanded its accessible-playground work beyond Griffith Park. In 2014, CBS Los Angeles reported that the organization was opening its 50th playground.

The organization also developed educational programs intended to encourage interaction among children with and without disabilities.

In 2024, the Los Angeles Times reported that more than 70 accessible playgrounds associated with the initiative had opened worldwide.

== Later work ==
Curry-Williams co-founded the She Angels Foundation in 2020. The foundation provides grants to nonprofit organizations supporting women and girls.

Curry-Williams serves on the board of directors of Every Day Action, a Los Angeles nonprofit organization that redistributes surplus prepared food from film and television productions to people experiencing food insecurity.

In 2024, Curry-Williams published Philanthropy on a Shoestring: How to Make a Difference on $1.40 a Day through Three Tomatoes Publishing.

== Awards and recognition ==
In 2015, Curry-Williams received the President's Lifetime Achievement Award for volunteer service. She was also named a L'Oréal Paris Women of Worth honoree that year. Points of Light named her Daily Point of Light No. 5702 in March 2016.

In 2018, Curry-Williams was selected as the Woman of the Year honoree for California's 46th Assembly District by Assemblymember Adrin Nazarian. The California Legislative Women's Caucus identified her as a co-founder of Shane's Inspiration in its record of the 2018 honorees.

== Selected works ==
Curry-Williams, Catherine (2024). Philanthropy on a Shoestring: How to Make a Difference on $1.40 a Day. Three Tomatoes Publishing. ISBN 9798990301481.
