= Environmental Investigation Agency =

Non-governmental environmental organisation

- Founded: 1984; 42 years ago
- Founder: Dave Currey; Jennifer Lonsdale; Allan Thornton
- Type: UK registered charity, number 1182208, EIA US 501(c)(3) not-for-profit
- Purpose: Environmentalism, public health
- Headquarters: London, Washington D.C.,
- Region served: Within the UK, United States and internationally
- Method: undercover investigation, lobbying for new legislation
- Chair: John Stephenson
- Revenue: income £3.1 million (2020 annual report)
- Employees: 45 (2020)
- Website: Environmental Investigation Agency UK Environmental Investigation Agency US

The Environmental Investigation Agency (EIA) is an international NGO founded in 1984 in the United Kingdom by environmental activists Dave Currey, Jennifer Lonsdale and Allan Thornton. At present, it has offices in London and Washington, D.C. The EIA covertly investigates and campaigns against environmental crime and abuse.

Its undercover investigations expose transnational wildlife crime, with a focus on elephants and tigers, and forest crimes such as illegal logging and deforestation for cash crops such as palm oil. It works to safeguard global marine ecosystems by addressing the threats posed by plastic pollution, by-catch and commercial exploitation of whales, dolphins and porpoises. It seeks to reduce the impact of climate change by campaigning to eliminate refrigerant greenhouse gases, exposing related illicit trade and improving energy efficiency in the cooling sector.

The EIA uses its findings in reports to campaign for new legislation, improved governance and more effective enforcement. In addition, its field experience is used to provide guidance to enforcement agencies and it also forms partnerships with local groups and activists, support their work through hands-on training.

== Areas of work ==
=== Climate ===
The EIA's Climate work tries to tackle the pressing threat of climate change by eliminating powerful greenhouse gases used widely in the cooling sector, improving energy efficiency of replacement technologies and investigating the illicit trade in refrigerant greenhouse gases. Key campaign areas include:

- The Montreal Protocol from 1987, regulating chlorofluorocarbons, which destroy Earth's ozone layer. EIA was instrumental in making the case that the Protocol was the best mechanism to phase out the harmful hydrofluorocarbons. This work resulted in the Kigali Amendment.
- EU F-Gas Regulation: EIA campaigned against industry lobbying to ensure a revision of the Fluorinated gases Regulation and as of 2018 continued to work for its effective implementation.
- Energy efficiency: As of 2018 EIA campaigned to ensure cooling systems are not only HFC-free, but are as efficient as possible.
- Cooling technologies: EIA campaigned to spread awareness of energy efficient climate-friendly alternatives after the phase-out of hydrochlorofluorocarbons (HCFCs) in developing countries.

=== Forests ===
The EIA's Forests work started in the late 1990s and aims to reduce global deforestation by advocating improved governance and trade laws, revealing the negative impacts of cash crops such as palm oil and exposing key criminal players in the transnational illegal trade in stolen timber. Key campaign areas include:

- Timber: EIA's investigations expose illegal logging, the illegal timber flows and the corruption which facilitates forest crime, using international laws to press for action and further reduce the scale of deforestation. In September 2022, the New York Times reported that EIA tracked logs from ecologically significant forests to 10 pellet mills and three power plants in Romania, Bulgaria, Slovakia and Poland; about a third of wood shipments to these factories originated in protected areas like Romania's Cheile Bicazului-Hasmas National Park.
- Palm oil: palm oil production is widely linked to deforestation, illegal logging, human rights abuses and biodiversity loss.
- Rights: Illegal logging and destructive forest conversion are directly connected to corruption and crime, cronyism, curbs on transparency and accountability, selective law enforcement, elitist land tenure and compromised judiciaries, and often involve state officials and security apparatus. Limited civil society participation exacerbates these problems. EIA's forest investigations and lobbying have uncovered serious failings in forest governance, forcing governments and industry to acknowledge the problems and address them.

=== Ocean ===
The EIA's Ocean work aims to improve the status of marine wildlife and ecosystems by reducing threats posed by marine plastic pollution, bycatch and commercial exploitation of whales, dolphins and porpoises. Key campaign areas include:

- Marine plastic pollution is one of the most serious emerging threats to the health of oceans and a major hazard to marine biodiversity. EIA has worked on the issue at the UK level and internationally, campaigning both alone and in partnerships against single-use plastics such as supermarket carrier bags, microbeads in rinse-off products and other forms of damaging plastic packaging.
- Fewer than 30 vaquita porpoises are believed to be left on the planet, making it the world's most endangered marine mammal – its extinction is imminent unless significant steps are taken to protect it. The vaquita is not hunted in its own right but is dying in illegal gill nets set for the totoaba fish, an endangered species whose dried swim bladder is prized in China.
- The international moratorium on commercial whaling is one of the greatest conservation successes of the 20th century . EIA campaigns to keep the ban in place, to expose the exploitation of those species it does not cover and to drive action to address other threats to whales, dolphins and porpoises such plastic, chemical and noise pollution as well as industrial-scale fishing.

=== Wildlife ===
EIA's Wildlife work started in the mid-1980s and aims to reduce wildlife crime around the world, advocating the dismantling of transnational criminal networks involved in illegal trade, pressing for better legislation and the closure of key markets, advocating improved enforcement techniques and exposing transnational organized criminal networks. Key campaign areas include:

- Ivory trade is the main culprit responsible for elephant poaching. For many years, EIA's investigations have revealed the extent of the problem, identifying the transnational criminal groups behind the trafficking, the corruption they drive, and have played a role in shutting down ivory trade. EIA continues to work for the closure of all domestic and international ivory markets.
- Pangolins are the world's most trafficked mammal, poached for illegal trade in their scales and meat. EIA works to enhance enforcement against the organised crime groups trafficking pangolins, providing information to enforcement authorities.
- EIA works for the recovery of wild tiger populations by advocating the dismantling of transnational criminal networks involved in illegal trade, such as the production of tiger bone wine pressing for better legislation and the protection of their habitat and exposing the role of tiger farming in both illegal and legal trade.
- EIA has created interactive Wildlife trade maps documenting the illegal trade in certain wildlife species as an open resource.

== Governance ==
As of 2020, EIA UK had 45 employees. EIA UK's board of Trustees included James Arrandale, Pesh Framjee, Jennifer Lonsdale (founder), Alice Railton, John Stephenson (chair), Kit Stoner, Paul Townley and Allan Thornton (founder).

In 2013, Stichting EIA was incorporated in The Netherlands but remained dormant. In 2019 EIA UK decided as a consequence of Brexit, to develop Stichting EIA as an office in the Hague focusing on EU and Dutch environmental policy issues.

== The Animal Detectives ==
In 1995, Independent Television Network (ITV) broadcast a TV series called The Animal Detectives in the UK. The series commissioned by Carlton Television was produced by Goldhawk together with Eco detectives, a company owned by directors of EIA. The series, based on EIA's undercover investigation work into the trade in endangered species, showed footage from EIA's undercover filming. The series had seven episodes, each covering a different group of animals like BEARS (01/06/1995), WHALES (25/05/1995), PARROTS (18/05/1995), WALRUS (11/05/1995), RHINOS (04/05/1995), TURTLES (30/03/1995) and MONKEYS (23/02/1995).

The series won the Media Natura award for best film, the Brigitte Bardot International Genesis Award (Los Angeles), and the Gold Plaque at the Chicago Documentary Film Festival.

== Reputation ==
In 2007, The US Environmental Protection Agency called the EIA's "investigative work, scientific documentation, and representation at international conventions ...highly effective and successful". In 2008, BBC Wildlife Magazine called EIA "a highly-respected, hard-hitting, dirt-digging organization". Earth Touch called the EIA " kind of like the FBI of environmental crime".
