= Robert Brownlee Currey =

American politician

- Robert Brownlee Currey ca. 1837
- Born: 1774
- Died: December 8, 1848 (aged 73–74); Nashville, Tennessee
- Occupation: Politician
- Spouse: Jane Gray Owen
- Children: Richard Owen Currey; Algernon B. Currey; Robert B. Currey; William Hume Currey; Algernon S. Currey; Washington J. Currey; John Currey; Elizabeth Jane Currey

Robert Brownlee Currey (1774–1848) was an American Jeffersonian Republican politician. He served as the mayor of Nashville, Tennessee, from 1822 to 1824.

== Early life ==
Currey was born in 1774.

== Career ==
Currey served as the first United States Postmaster in Nashville. From 1822 to 1824, he served as Mayor of Nashville.

== Personal life and death ==
Currey was married to Jane Gray Owen. They had eight children, Richard Owen Currey (1816–1865), Algernon B. (died 1815, 7 months old), Robert B. (1817–1860), William Hume (1818–1831), Algernon S., Washington J., John, and Elizabeth Jane. He died on December 8, 1848, in Nashville.

Political offices
Preceded by John Patton Erwin	Mayor of Nashville, Tennessee; 1822–1824	Succeeded by Randal McGavock
