= Richard Owen Currey =

American politician

- Born: July 28, 1816; Nashville, Tennessee
- Died: February 17, 1865 (aged 48); Salisbury, North Carolina
- Occupations: University professor, physician, preacher
- Spouse: Rachel Jackson Eastin
- Parents: Robert Brownlee Currey; Jane Grey Currey
- Military career
- Allegiance: Confederate States of America (1861–1865)
- Branch: Confederate States Army
- Service years: 1861–1865
- Rank: Surgeon, chaplain

Richard Owen Currey (1816–1865) was an American academic, medical doctor and Presbyterian minister. He was a professor at the University of Nashville and the publisher of agrarian and medical journals. During the American Civil War, he was a surgeon and chaplain for the Confederate States Army.

== Early life ==
Richard Owen Currey was born on July 28, 1816 in Nashville, Tennessee. His father, Robert Brownlee Currey (1774–1848), served as the mayor of Nashville from 1822 to 1824.

Currey graduated from the University of Nashville in 1836. He attended Transylvania University from 1837 to 1838, where he studied medicine, and he earned his MD from the University of Pennsylvania in 1840.

== Career ==
Currey was a physician, who also taught medicine in Tennessee. He became a Professor of Chemistry, Experimental Philosophy, and Natural History at East Tennessee University in 1846, and he pioneered laboratory-based botany teaching in Tennessee. In 1850, he left East Tennessee University to teach at the University of Nashville. By 1858, he joined the faculty at Shelby Medical College, also located in Nashville, followed by the Daughter's Collegiate Institute in Knoxville.

Currey was a member of the Tennessee State Medical Association. He was also the co-founder of a hospital and medical school in Knoxville, and the owner of an apothecary shop in Nashville. Over the course of his career, Currey published and edited many journals, including the Southern Agriculturist, the Southern Journal of the Medical and Physical Sciences and the Nashville Monthly Record of Medical and Physical Sciences.

Currey became the pastor of Lebanon-in-the-Fork Presbyterian Church in Knoxville. During the American Civil War, he joined the Confederate States Army as a chaplain-surgeon.

== Personal life and death ==
Currey married Rachel Jackson Eastin in 1842. He died on February 17, 1865, while serving the Confederate States Army during the Civil War.

== Bibliography ==
- Iron (Philadelphia, Pennsylvania: University of Pennsylvania Press, 1840).
- Chemical Hall Almanac: For the Year of Our Lord 1852...Calculated for the Horizon of Nashville, Tennessee...Will Answer for Kentucky, Mississippi and Alabama (W.F. Bang, Republican Banner Office, 1851).
- A Sketch of the Geology of Tennessee (Kinsloe & Rice, 1857).
- A Geological Visit to the Virginia Copper Region (1859).
- The Polk County Copper Company of Tennessee: Its Mineral Resources and Mining Prospects (with Matthew Fontaine Maury, Bulletin Book and Job Office, 1859).
