= General Currie (disambiguation) =

General Currie or Curry may refer to:

- Arthur Currie (1875–1933), Canadian Army general
- Dennis Hadley Currie (1874–1928), U.S. Army brigadier general
- Fendall Currie (1841–1920), British Indian Army major general
- James B. Currie (1925–2009), U.S. Air Force major general
- John F. Curry (1886–1973), U.S. Army Air Forces major general
- William D. Curry (1926–2013), U.S. Air Force brigadier general
