= Frederick Currie =

Frederick Currie may refer to:

- Sir Frederick Currie, 1st Baronet (1799–1875), English diplomat
- Sir Frederick Currie, 2nd Baronet (1823–1900)
- Frederick Currie (cricketer), English cricketer and British Army officer

== See also ==
- Fred Curry (disambiguation)
- Frederick Currey, English rugby union player
- Currie baronets
- Currie (surname)
