= Corrie family =

Scottish family

Arms of the Corries (or Curries) of Newbie, a branch of the family.

The Corrie family, also known as the Currie family, was a Scottish family which was once seated in what is today the civil parish of Hutton and Corrie, in Annandale, Dumfriesshire, Scotland. The leading branch of the family were the Corries of that Ilk. Members of the family are on record in the Middle Ages. The family held numerous lands, but lost the lands from which they derived their surname, with the marriage of an heiress, sometime during the reign of James V, King of Scots.

== Surname ==
There are numerous etymological origins for the surnames Corrie and Currie, but the family derives its surname from the lands of Corrie, in what is today the civil parish of Hutton and Corrie, in Dumfries and Galloway, Scotland. The place name is derived from the Gaelic coire, meaning "cauldron", which was used in place names to describe a circular valley on the side of a mountain.

== Lands ==
The family has held lands in both Scotland and England. At one time, the family held the Barony of Corrie, in what is today Hutton and Corrie, in Dumfries and Galloway; Kelwood, which is now with the parish of Kirkandrews upon Esk, in Cumberland; Comlongan, Ruthwell, the Barony of Newbie; the Barony of Stapleton; Robgill; part of the parish of St. Patrick, which is now divided into the parish Kirkpatrick-Fleming; and Gretna.

== History ==
The Norse Chronicle Hákonar saga Hákonarsonar records the valiant deeds of a Scottish knight at the Battle of Largs in 1263. His name is recorded in the saga as "Ferus" and "Perus", and it describes how he rode out through the ranks of enemy—the Norwegians—and back to his own lines to safety before being slain. Modern historians have tentatively identified this saga character with Piers de Curry. from Ayrshire, who was a vassal of the Stewarts. However, it is not certain that he was connected with the Annandale family.

An early member of the family was Walter de Corrie (aka de Curry), who is recorded in the Ragman Rolls and was Keeper of Dumfries, Wigton and Kirkcudbrightshire castles. He was initially loyal to the King of England during the Wars of Scottish Independence and held land at Levington, Cumberland that was burnt and laid to waste by the Scots. He died by 1303 and was succeeded by his 22-year-old son also called Walter de Corrie. Walter jnr had his lands confiscated in 1310 due to his association with Christopher Seton, the co-murderer of Sir John Comyn, but had them restored upon his apparent return to the king's side in 1311. His loyalty did not last long and by 1314 his lands were granted to Sir William Marmion. Walter took part in the unsuccessful Siege of Carlisle (1315) where he was knighted by Robert the Bruce.

Another early member of the family is recorded in the Rotuli Scotiæ, in 1367-1368, where he is granted safe conduct by Edward III, King of England—"Robertus Corry de Valle Annandiæ de Scot, cum sex equitibus". The Corries of that Ilk, and the Corries of Newbie, appear numerous times in Public Records in the 15th and 16th centuries. During the reign of James V, King of Scots, the family lost their old seat from which they derived their surname, when a Johnstone of Annandale married the daughter and heiress of Sir Thomas Currie. A branch of the family held Kelwood until the end of the 16th century, when it passed into the possession of the Charteris family.

== Possible descendants of the family ==
A branch of the Corrie family settled in Duns, Berwickshire. Many notable Curries trace their ancestry to a Currie who is recorded in early records of the area—one William Currie (fl. 1609), who held lands called "Currie Parks". A son of William (fl. 1609) was William Currie (died 1681). A son of William (died 1681) was one James Currie, from whom descended James Currie, the biographer of the Scottish poet Robert Burns.

Another son of William (died 1681) was William Currie (1628–1695). Descending from this William, in the male-line, was William Currie (1721–1781), who was a London banker. A son of William's was Mark Currie (1759–1835). Sons of Mark included Vice-Admiral Mark John Currie, RN (1795–1874), and Sir Frederick Currie, 1st Bt (1799–1875). From Sir Frederick descend the Currie baronets —whose son was Sir Frederick Larkins Currie, 2nd Baronet (1823–1900), whose sons were Sir Frederick Reeve Currie, 3rd Baronet (1851–1930), and Sir Walter Louis Rackham Currie, 4th Baronet (1856–1941). A son of the 4th baronet was Sir Walter Mordaunt Cyril Currie, 5th Baronet (1894–1978).

A younger son of William Currie (1721–1781) was Isaac Currie (1760–1843), whose son was Raikes Currie. A son of Raikes was Philip Henry Wodehouse Currie, 1st (and last) Baron Currie of Hawley.

== Heraldry ==
The coat of arms borne by the heads of the family was blazoned gules, a saltire, in chief a rose argent. The same arms were borne by the Corries of Newbie. According to Alexander Nisbet, the Corries of Kelwood bore the same arms but differenced with a chief sable (as illustrated in Pont's manuscript); according to R. R. Stodart, they differenced their arms with a chief argent.

Like other families that were historically seated in the Annandale vicinity (such as the Johnstones of Johnstone, and the Torthorwalds of that Ilk), the heraldry of the Corrie family resembles that of the Bruces.

As late as 1881, no coat of arms had been registered in Scotland for the names Corrie and Currie, although in England, the mid-19th century, Sir Frederick Currie, 1st Baronet was granted arms blazoned gules, a saltire couped argent in chief a rose of the last barbed and seeded proper.

The heraldry borne by the Corrie family has also influenced the heraldry of another family—the Lowry-Corry Earls of Belmore. The mother of the first earl descended from John Curry from Dumfries, who settled in Belfast as a merchant, in 1641.
