= John Underwood Bateman-Champain =

Military engineer

Sir John Underwood Bateman-Champain
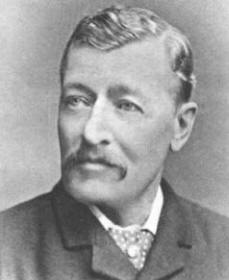
- John Underwood Bateman-Champain in 1875
- Born: 22 July 1835; London
- Died: 1 February 1887 (aged 51); Sanremo

Colonel Sir John Underwood Bateman-Champain, KCMG (22 July 1835 – 1 February 1887), born Champain, was a British Army officer and engineer in India, who was instrumental in laying the first electric telegraph line from Britain to India via the Persian Gulf. He assumed the additional name of Bateman on succeeding to the estate of Halton Park, Lancashire, in 1870.

== Early life and education ==
Champain was born in Gloucester Place, London, on 22 July 1835, the son of Colonel Agnew Champain (d.1876) of the 9th Regiment of Foot. He was educated at Cheltenham College, and for a short time in fortification and military drawing at the Edinburgh Military Academy under Lieutenant Henry Yule. From 1851 to 1853 he attended the East India Company's Military Seminary at Addiscombe, passing out at the head of his term and receiving the Pollock Medal. He obtained a commission as second lieutenant in the Bengal Engineers on 11 June 1853. His later commissions were dated: Lieutenant, 13 July 1857; Captain, 1 September 1863; Major, 5 July 1872; Lieutenant-Colonel, 31 December 1878; and Colonel, 31 December 1882.

== Indian Rebellion ==
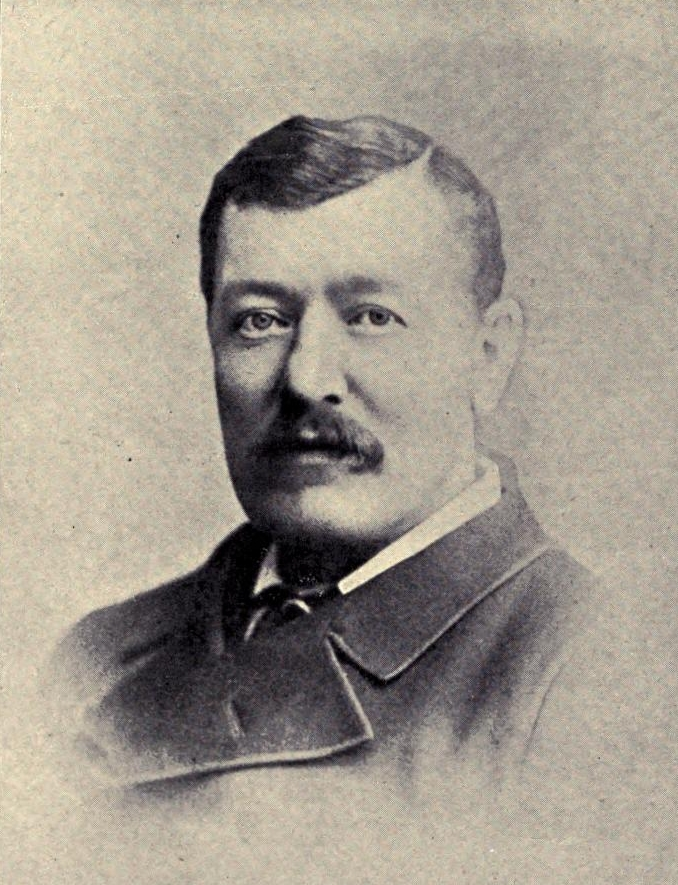

Following a further course of professional instruction in military engineering at the Royal Engineers Establishment at Chatham, Champain went to India in 1854. He was appointed assistant principal of the Thomason College of Civil Engineering at Roorkee, but while he was there the Indian Rebellion of 1857 broke out. He at once saw active service under Colonel Archdale Wilson, was adjutant of sappers and miners at the actions at Ghazi-ud-din-Nagar on the Hindon River on 30 and 31 May, at Badli-ki-Serai under Major-General Henry Barnard on 8 June, and at the capture of the ridge in front of Delhi. During the Siege of Delhi, Champain took his full share of general engineer work in addition to his duties as adjutant, and one of the siege batteries was named after him by order of the chief engineer (Col. Richard Baird Smith) in acknowledgement of his services. He was wounded by grapeshot on 13 September, but, while still on the sick list, volunteered for duty on 20 September: although still very lame, he was present at the capture of the palace of Delhi.

Champain commanded the headquarters detachment of Bengal sappers during the march to Agra, at the capture of Fathpur Sikri, and in numerous minor expeditions. He commanded a mixed force of nearly two thousand men on the march from Agra to Fatehgarh, where he joined the commander-in-chief in December 1857. He commanded the sappers during the march to Cawnpore and to the Alambagh, reverting to the adjutancy in March 1858, when he joined the force under Sir James Outram for the siege of Lucknow by Lord Clyde. During the siege he thrice acted as orderly officer to Sir Robert Napier, by whom he was especially thanked for holding with Captain Medley and one hundred sappers for a whole night the advanced post of Shah Najif, which had been abandoned.

After the capture of Lucknow he erected some twenty fortified posts for outlying detachments. In April he was employed under Brigadier-General (afterwards Sir) John Douglas in the Ghazipur and Shahabad districts, was present in fourteen minor engagements, and was thanked in despatches for his services at the action of Ballia. He joined in the pursuit of the rebels, who, after incessant marching and fighting, were driven to the Kaimur Hills and finally defeated and broken up at Salia Dahar on 24 November 1858. He received the medal and clasps.

== Telegraph work ==
When the rebellion was finally suppressed Champain became executive engineer in the public works department at Goudah, and afterwards at Lucknow. In February 1862 he was selected (at the invitation of the now Colonel Henry Yule) to go with Major (Sir) Patrick Stewart to Persia on government telegraph duty. At that time there was no electric telegraph from Britain to India, and the lack of one had been urgently felt during the Rebellion. The attempt to construct one under a government guarantee had failed, and it was determined to make a line by the Persian Gulf route directly under government. Champain proceeded with Stewart to Bushehr, and thence in June to Teheran, where negotiations were carried on with the Persian government. In 1865 the line was practically completed, and on Stewart's death in that year Champain was appointed to assist Sir Frederic Goldsmid, the chief director of the Indo-European Government Telegraph department. He spent the greater part of 1866 in Turkey, putting the Baghdad part of the line into an efficient state, and in 1867 went to St. Petersburg to negotiate for a special wire through Russia to join the Persian system. This visit gave rise to close relations with General Alexander von Lüders, director-general of Russian telegraphs, which proved of advantage to the service.

On his way out from England in September 1869, to superintend the laying of a second telegraph cable from Bushehr to Jask, Champain was nearly drowned in the wreck of the SS Carnatic off the island of Shadwan in the Red Sea. After coming to the surface he assisted in saving lives and in securing help.

In 1870 he succeeded Sir Frederic Goldsmid as chief director of the Indo-European Government Telegraph Department.

From 1870 to 1872 Persia suffered from a severe famine, and Champain took an active interest in the Mansion House relief fund, of which he was for some time secretary. He arranged for the distribution of aid in Persia by the telegraph staff, and had the satisfaction of finding the task very well done. His sound judgment and unfailing tact, together with a power of expressing his views clearly and concisely, enabled him to render important service at the periodical international telegraph conferences as the representative of the Indian government. Special questions frequently arose the settlement of which took him to many of the European capitals, and in the ordinary course of his duties he made repeated visits to India, Turkey, Persia, and the Persian Gulf.

In 1884 the Shah of Persia presented him with a magnificent sword of honour. In October 1885 Champain went for the last time to the Persian Gulf to lay a third cable between Bushehr and Jask, afterwards visiting Calcutta to confer with government. On his way home he went to Delhi to see his old friend Sir Frederick Roberts, from whom he learned that he had been made a knight commander of the Order of St. Michael and St. George, in recognition of his "services, during many years, in connection with the telegraph in India".

== Other activities ==
Champain was a member of the council of the Royal Geographical Society, and of the Society of Telegraph Engineers, of which he was President in 1879.

He was also an accomplished draughtsman. In the Albert Hall Exhibition of 1873 a gold medal was awarded to a Persian landscape which he had painted for his friend Sir Robert Murdoch Smith. Many of the illustrations to Sir Frederic Goldsmid's Telegraph and Travel are from original sketches in water-colour by Bateman-Champain.

== Death ==
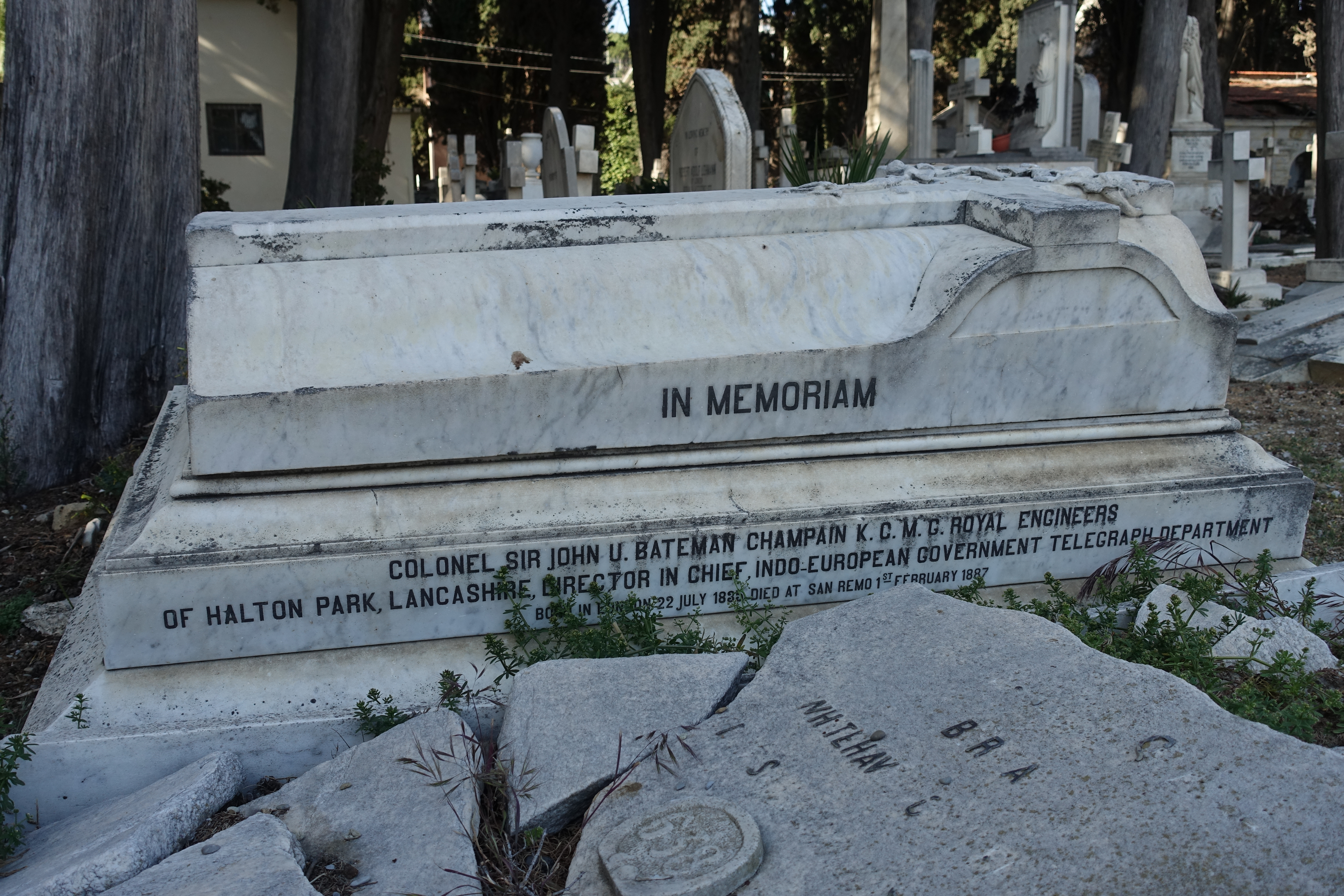
The tombstone of John Underwood Bateman-Champain in Sanremo (Italy).

In later life, Bateman-Champain suffered from hay fever, asthma, and eventually bronchitis, and in January 1887 he was persuaded to leave England for the Mediterranean for the sake of his health. After spending three weeks at Cannes, France, he went to Sanremo, Italy, where he died on 1 February 1887. The Shah of Persia sent a telegram to his family expressing his great regret for the loss of Bateman-Champain, "qui a laissé tant de souvenirs ineffaçables en Perse" ("who has left so many indelible memories in Persia"), a very unusual departure from the rigid etiquette of the court of Teheran.

== Personal life ==
In 1865 Champain married Harriet Sophie Currie, eldest daughter of Sir Frederick Currie, 1st Baronet, who survived him. They had six sons Arthur, Hugh, Claude, Francis, Philip and John, and two daughters Mary Rosaline (wife of Major David John Jackson Hill) and Alice. Three of the sons entered the army; one the navy; and one, John, the church. Four of the sons (Hugh, Claude, Francis and John) played cricket for Gloucestershire County Cricket Club. Harriet Sophie survived her husband's death and died on 14 August 1905.

== Sources ==
- Vibart, H.M. (1894). Addiscombe: its heroes and men of note. Westminster: Archibald Constable. pp. 603–8. OL 23336661M.

Attribution This article incorporates text from a publication now in the public domain: Lee, Sidney, ed. (1901). "Bateman-Champain, John Underwood". Dictionary of National Biography (1st supplement). London: Smith, Elder & Co.
