= Hugh Bateman-Champain =

English cricketer and Indian Army officer

Brigadier-General Hugh Bateman-Champain CMG
- Born: Hugh Frederick Bateman-Champain; 6 April 1869; Ashford, Middlesex, England
- Died: 7 October 1933 (aged 64); Ascot, Berkshire, England
- Cricket career

Personal information
- Batting: Right-handed
- Relatives: Claude Bateman-Champain (brother), Francis Bateman-Champain (brother), John Bateman-Champain (brother), Fendall Currie (uncle), Sir Frederick Larkins Currie (uncle), Robert Currie (uncle), William Currie (uncle).

Domestic team information
- Years: Team
- 1902: Marylebone Cricket Club
- 1888–1902: Gloucestershire

Career statistics
Competition	FC
Matches	12
Runs scored	142
Batting average	8.35
100s/50s	–/–
Top score	35
Balls bowled	–
Wickets	–
Bowling average	–
5 wickets in innings	–
10 wickets in match	–
Best bowling	–
Catches/stumpings	8/–
- Source: Cricinfo, 24 June 2010

Brigadier-General Hugh Frederick Bateman-Champain, CMG (6 April 1869 – 7 October 1933) was an Indian Army officer and cricketer.

== Sports career ==
Bateman-Champain was a right-handed batsman who played 11 first-class matches for Gloucestershire, with his debut for the county coming in 1888 against Yorkshire and his final first-class match for the county coming against Surrey in 1902. He also represented the Marylebone Cricket Club in a single first-class match in 1902 against Kent.

== Death ==
Bateman-Champain died at Ascot, Berkshire on 7 October 1933.

== Family ==
Educated Cheltenham College and Royal Military Academy Sandhurst.

Eldest son of Colonel Sir John Underwood Bateman-Champain, KCMG, RE and Harriet Sophie Currie.

Bateman-Champain was part of a large cricketing family. His brothers Claude, Francis and John all played first-class cricket, as did his uncles Fendall Currie, Sir Frederick Larkins Currie, Robert Currie and William Currie.

He married in Gloucester Cathedral on 3 February 1904 Dorothy Gertrude Arbuthnot, daughter of politician George Arbuthnot, and had two daughters.

== Military career ==
Bateman-Champain joined the West Yorkshire Regiment in 1889. He transferred to the Indian Army and joined the 1 Gorkha Rifles in 1891. During the Great War he served on the Western Front in France and then was posted to Gallipoli 1914–15. He was promoted to Brigade Commander and sent first to Mesopotamia followed by North Persia 1917–20 with 36th Indian Brigade.

He continued to serve in the Russian Civil War. During the Anzali Operation he was made prisoner of war when, on 18 May 1920, the red Russian Caspian sea flotilla under Admiral Raskolnikov with a 1500 men naval commando completely surprised the White Caspian Flotilla and the British detachment supporting it at Enseli, in neutral Persia. Bateman-Champain and the British crews surrendered, but were eventually released in exchange for all ships (10 auxiliary cruisers and 7 transports) and weapons (50 artillery pieces with 20 000 shots). This episode led to his being relieved of command.

He gained the rank of Colonel (Honorary Brigadier-General) in the service of the Indian Army. He retired in 1921 and became General-Secretary of the British Red Cross Society from then until his death.
