= Claude Bateman-Champain =

English cricketer

Claude Edward Bateman-Champain
- Born: 30 March 1875
- Died: 13 October 1956 (aged 81)
- Occupation: Cricketer

Claude Edward Bateman-Champain (30 March 1875 – 13 October 1956) was an English cricketer. A right-handed batsman and occasional right-arm slow bowler, he played eighteen matches for Gloucestershire between 1898 and 1907. A member of a cricketing family, his brothers John, Francis and Hugh all played first-class cricket; his uncles Fendall, Frederick, Robert and William Currie also played.
