= Frederick Currie (cricketer) =

English cricketer and British Army officer (1851–1902)

Personal information
- Full name: Frederick Alexander Currie
- Born: 23 September 1851; Ferozepore, Punjab, British India
- Died: 13 June 1902 (aged 50); Aldeburgh, Suffolk, England
- Batting: Right-handed
- Relatives: Cecil Currie (cousin); Fendall Currie (cousin); Sir Frederick Currie (cousin); Robert Currie (cousin); William Currie (cousin)

Domestic team information
- Years: Team
- 1894: Marylebone Cricket Club

Career statistics
Competition	First-class
Matches	1
Runs scored	10
Batting average	5.00
100s/50s	–/–
Top score	7
Catches/stumpings	1/–
- Source: Cricinfo, 25 October 2021

Frederick Alexander Currie (23 September 1851 – 13 June 1902) was an English first-class cricketer and British Army officer.

The son of Major Mark Edward Currie, he was born in British India at Ferozepore in September 1851. He was educated in England at Harrow School, where he played for the school cricket team. From Harrow he attended the Royal Military College, Sandhurst from which he graduated into the 16th Foot as a sub-lieutenant in September 1869, before transferring to the Royal Norfolk Regiment in November 1872. Promotion to lieutenant followed in July 1874, which was antedated to July 1872. He saw action in British India, serving in the Jowaki Expedition against the Jowaki Afridi tribe in 1877–78. Following the expedition he fought in the Second Anglo-Afghan War and was present at the Battle of Ali Masjid. He was promoted to captain in November 1881, with promotion to major following in June 1884. He was later appointed a lieutenant colonel, at which point he retired from active service.

Currie played first-class cricket for the Marylebone Cricket Club (MCC), making a single appearance against Leicestershire at Lord's in 1894. Batting twice in the match, he was dismissed for 7 runs by Dick Pougher in the MCC first innings, while in their second innings he was dismissed for 3 runs by the same bowler. In addition to playing first-class cricket, Currie also played minor matches for Norfolk from 1880 to 1901, but did not feature for the county in the Minor Counties Championship. Currie died in June 1902 at Aldeburgh, Suffolk. His grandfather was Sir Frederick Currie, while several cousins also played cricket at first-class level.
