= Fred Koury =

The name Fred Koury may refer to one of the following:

- Fred Curry, American wrestler born Fred Thomas Koury Jr.
- Frederick J. Koury, founder of City-As-School High School

== See also ==
- Fred Coury, American musician
- Fred Curry (disambiguation)
