= John Bateman-Champain =

English cricketer (1880–1950)

- Bishop of Knaresborough
- Diocese: Diocese of Ripon
- In office: 1938–1948
- Predecessor: Paul de Labilliere
- Successor: Henry de Candole
- Other post: Provost of Newcastle (1931–1938)

Orders
- Ordination: 1903 (deacon); 1904 (priest)
- Consecration: 24 February 1938 by William Temple

Personal details
- Born: 14 March 1880 Richmond Hill, Surrey, England
- Died: 22 October 1950 (aged 70) Westbury-on-Trym, Gloucestershire, England
- Denomination: Anglican
John Bateman-Champain
Cricket information
- Batting: Right-handed
Domestic team information
- Years: Team
- 1899: Gloucestershire
Career statistics
Competition	First-class
Matches	5
Runs scored	36
Batting average	5.14
100s/50s	–/–
Top score	17
Balls bowled	6
Wickets	–
Bowling average	–
5 wickets in innings	–
10 wickets in match	–
Best bowling	–
Catches/stumpings	2/–
- Source: Cricinfo, 26 June 2010

John Norman Bateman-Champain (14 March 1880 – 22 October 1950) was a British Anglican bishop who served as Bishop of Knaresborough, the suffragan bishop of the Church of England Diocese of Ripon. He had previously been a first-class English cricketer, making five appearances (two for Gloucestershire: and three for the Free Foresters); he was a right-handed batsman.

== Early life and education ==
Bateman-Champain was born at Richmond Hill, Surrey. Bateman-Champain was born into a military family, son of army officer John Underwood Bateman-Champain (of the Bengal Royal Engineers). John Norman was educated at Cheltenham College and Gonville and Caius College, Cambridge, and studied for ordination at Wells Theological College.

== Sporting career ==
Bateman-Champain played 2 first-class matches for Gloucestershire in 1899, with his debut for the county coming against Lancashire and his second and final first-class match for the county coming against Nottinghamshire. Additionally, he also represented the Free Foresters in a 3 first-class matches, firstly in 1919 against Cambridge University and Oxford University and finally against Oxford University in 1920.

== Ecclesiastical career ==
Upon graduating theological college, Bateman-Champain was made deacon at Advent 1903 and ordained priest the following Advent (18 December 1904) — both times by George Forrest Browne, Bishop of Bristol, at Bristol Cathedral. He served his title as assistant curate of St Mary Redcliffe, Bristol until 1908; from 1904 onwards, John Maud (his future father-in-law) was Vicar of St Mary Redcliffe. His first post was overseas (South Africa) as vicar of Krugersdorp and St Boniface Church, Germiston. On the Feast of the Ascension (16 May) 1912, he was instituted Vicar of St Mary Redcliffe. During the Great War he was interviewed for a commission with the Army Chaplains' Department, and was described as an 'attractive personality A1'. He was sent to the Western Front and, from 1918, served at General Headquarters.

Remaining at Redcliffe until 1928, he became also Rural Dean of Bedminster starting in 1927, before a ten-year stint as Vicar of Newcastle Cathedral (to which he was instituted on 31 October 1928). While at Newcastle, he was the first Vicar to bear the additional title Provost, becoming Provost of Newcastle in 1931 (after the Cathedrals Measure 1931). His final appointment was as Bishop of Knaresborough, a suffragan bishop in the Diocese of Ripon; alongside this, he held the Rectory of Methley. He was consecrated a bishop on St Matthias' day (24 February) 1938, by William Temple, Archbishop of York, at York Minster. On 15 July 1944, he was appointed as the second principal of the RAF Chaplains' School based at Magdalene College, Cambridge. Clergymen with a sporting background were favoured in the RAF Chaplains Branch, and the Master of Magdalene College would later comment that Bateman-Champain's presence in college "brought lustre and distinction to the scene". He continued as Bishop of Knaresborough until retirement to Bristol in 1948.

== Family and later life ==
Bateman-Champain was part of a large cricketing family. His brothers Claude, Francis and Hugh all played first-class cricket, as did his brother-in-law Frederick Currie. His uncles Fendall Currie, Revd Sir Frederick Currie, Robert Currie and William Currie also played first-class cricket.

During his second time at Redcliffe, he married in 1912, Jean Monsell Maud, eldest daughter of John Maud, previously Vicar there (while Bateman-Chapmain was Curate) but by then Bishop of Kensington; they had two sons and two daughters. One son was killed on active service in 1943. Bateman-Champain died at Westbury-on-Trym on 22 October 1950.

Church of England titles
New title	Provost of Newcastle; 1931–1938	Succeeded by George Brigstocke
Preceded by Paul de Labilliere	Bishop of Knaresborough; 1938–1948	Succeeded by Henry de Candole
