= Treaty of Amritsar =

The Treaty of Amritsar may refer to:

- Treaty of Amritsar, 1809, an agreement between the British East India Company and Ranjit Singh, founder of the Sikh empire
- Treaty of Amritsar, 1846, a treaty formalizing the arrangements in the Treaty of Lahore between the British East India Company and Maharaja Gulab Singh Dogra after the First Anglo-Sikh War
