= Francis Bateman-Champain =

English cricketer

Personal information
- Full name: Francis Henry Bateman-Champain
- Born: 17 June 1877; Richmond Hill, Surrey, England
- Died: 29 December 1942 (aged 65); Tiverton, Devon, England
- Batting: Right-handed
- Bowling: Right-arm slow
- Role: Batsman

Domestic team information
- Years: Team
- 1895–1914: Gloucestershire
- 1897–1900: Oxford University
- First-class debut: 8 August 1895 Gloucestershire v Middlesex
- Last First-class: 31 August 1914 Gloucestershire v Surrey

Career statistics
Competition	First-class
Matches	114
Runs scored	4,677
Batting average	24.61
100s/50s	5/24
Top score	149
Balls bowled	815
Wickets	17
Bowling average	24.58
5 wickets in innings	1
10 wickets in match	0
Best bowling	6/62
Catches/stumpings	100/–
- Source: CricketArchive, 1 May 2014

Francis Henry Bateman-Champain (17 June 1877 – 29 December 1942) was an English cricketer playing primarily for Gloucestershire County Cricket Club and Oxford University Cricket Club between 1895 and 1914. A right-handed batsman and occasional right-arm slow bowler, he came from a cricketing family: his brothers John, Claude and Hugh all played first-class cricket. His uncles Fendall, Frederick, Robert and William Currie also played. Francis played 114 matches in his career, scoring 4,677 runs at a batting average of 24.61. over 3,300 of these were scored for Gloucestershire, for whom he made four of his five centuries. Born in Richmond Hill, Surrey, he died in Tiverton, Devon.

== First-class career ==
Champain made his debut for Gloucestershire in 1895, before going up to Oxford, but he had limited success in those initial first-class appearances, scoring only four runs in his three innings, with combined bowling figures of 2/38 His 1896 season for Gloucestershire was rather better, with 152 first-class runs while being dismissed seven times, although without taking any wickets. In the 1897 season he played for both Gloucestershire and Oxford University, switching between the two depending upon whether the university was in term. His season for Oxford was excellent, with 515 first-class runs at 30.29, leading it to be commented that "Mr Champain again shewed himself to be one of the best of the young amateurs of the day". He then played for Gloucestershire, scoring a further 364 runs at 22.75, to finish the season with 879 runs at 26.53.

The 1898 season again saw Champain play for both Oxford University and Gloucestershire. Although Champain's averages for both Oxford and Gloucestershire were down on the previous season - finishing with 553 runs at 19.06 in all first-class cricket - he made his maiden first-class century against Lancashire in July, an innings described as "almost perfect".

Bateman-Champaign was educated at Cheltenham College and Hertford College, Oxford. He became a schoolteacher and taught at Wellington College and at Cheltenham College.
