= Cecil Currie =

English cricketer

Personal information
- Full name: Cecil Edmund Currie
- Born: 4 April 1861; Brightwalton, Berkshire, England
- Died: 2 January 1937 (aged 75); Staines, Middlesex, England
- Batting: Right-handed
- Bowling: Right-arm slow
- Relatives: Sir Frederick Currie (father); Frederick Currie (cousin); Fendall Currie (uncle); Robert Currie (uncle); William Currie (uncle)

Domestic team information
- Years: Team
- 1881–1885: Hampshire
- 1883: Cambridge University

Career statistics
Competition	First-class
Matches	20
Runs scored	300
Batting average	12.00
100s/50s	–/–
Top score	32
Balls bowled	3,318
Wickets	64
Bowling average	22.28
5 wickets in innings	2
10 wickets in match	1
Best bowling	8/57
Catches/stumpings	9/–
- Source: Cricinfo, 6 February 2010

Cecil Edmund Currie (4 April 1861 – 2 January 1937) was an English first-class cricketer, who played for Cambridge University and Hampshire. Outside cricket, he was a solicitor at Freshfields and Leese in London.

== Life and cricket career ==
The son of The Reverend Sir Frederick Currie, he was born in April 1861 at Brightwalton, Berkshire. He was educated at Marlborough College, before matriculating to Trinity College, Cambridge. Following the end of his first year at Cambridge, Currie made his debut in first-class cricket for Hampshire against Sussex at Southampton in 1881. The following season he played once for Hampshire against Somerset, taking his maiden five wicket haul in the match with figures of 8 for 57 in Somerset's first innings, helping to dismiss them for 101. During his final year at Cambridge in 1883, he made two first-class appearances at Fenner's for Cambridge University Cricket Club against C. I. Thornton's XI and Yorkshire. Following his graduation from Cambridge, Currie played first-class cricket for Hampshire until 1885, the year that they lost their first-class status. He continued his association with Hampshire in second-class county cricket until 1893. Playing in the Hampshire side as a slow bowler, he took 56 wickets for the county at an average of 21.87; he took two five wicket hauls and once took ten wickets in a match. His overall first-class career saw him take 64 wickets, while as a lower order batsman he scored 300 runs with a highest score of 32. He later returned to first-class cricket when he played for the Oxford and Cambridge Universities Past and Present cricket team at Portsmouth against the touring Australians in 1888 and 1890.

Outside of cricket, Currie was a solicitor in the firm Messes Freshfields and Leese, with the cricketer Sir William Leese being a partner in the firm being. On 6 February 1894, he married Louisa Fanny née Drury, daughter of Major-General George Drury. Currie died at Staines-upon-Thames in January 1937. Several family members also played cricket at first-class level, these were: his uncle, William Currie, and cousins Fendall, Frederick, and Robert Currie.
