= Treaty of Lahore =

1846 peace treaty

Treaty of Peace Between the British Government and the State of Lahore
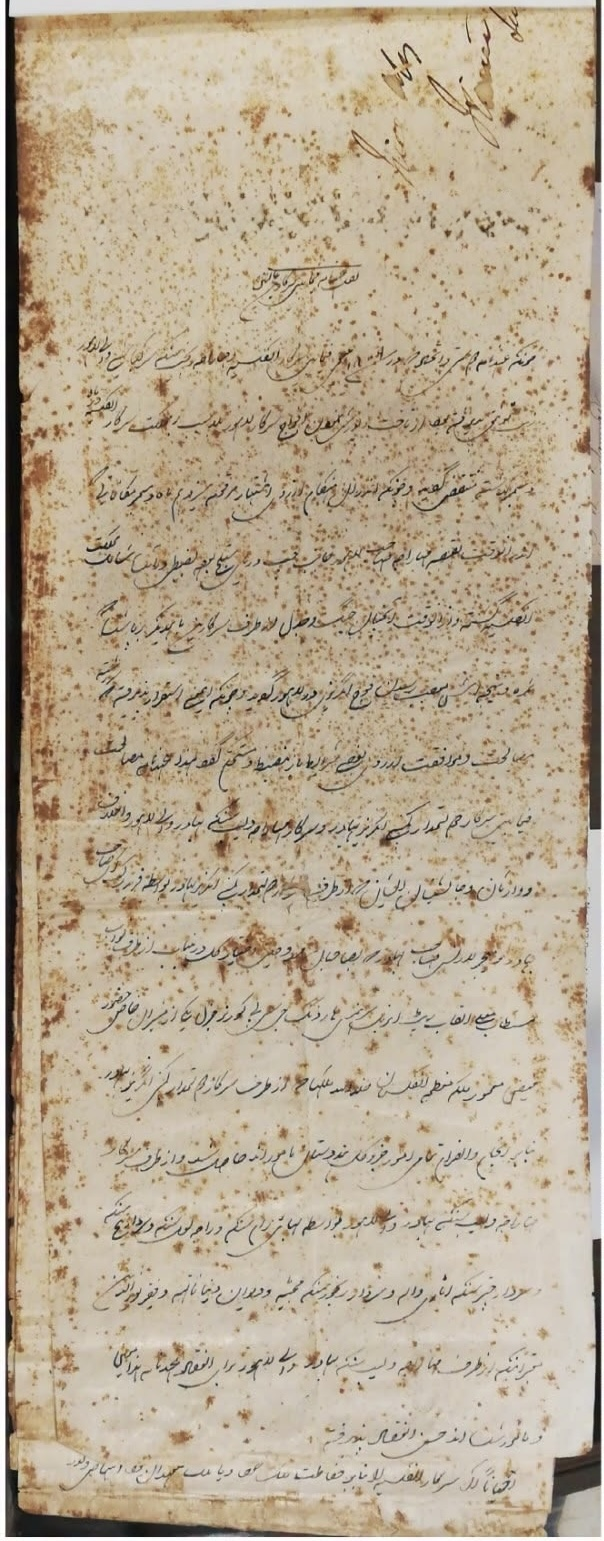
- Original Persian treaty, 9 March 1846
- Type: Peace treaty
- Context: First Anglo-Sikh War
- Drafted: 9 March 1846
- Signed: 9 March 1846; 180 years ago
- Location: Lahore, Sikh Empire
- Sealed: 11 March 1846 (with supplementary articles)
- Effective: 9 March 1846
- Signatories: East India Company (Note: On behalf of the British government); Khalsa Darbar (Note: Imperial court of the Sikh Empire; signed by seven members from Hazara, Malwa, and Bist Doab)
- Parties: British Empire; Sikh Empire
- Depositary: Government of the United Kingdom
- Language: English; Persian

The Treaty of Lahore of 9 March 1846 was a peace treaty marking the end of the First Anglo-Sikh War. The treaty was concluded, for the British, by the Governor-General Sir Henry Hardinge and two officers of the East India Company and, for the Sikhs, by the seven-year-old Maharaja Duleep Singh and seven members of Hazara, the territory to the south of the river Sutlej and the forts and territory in the Jalandhar Doab between the rivers Sutlej and Beas. In addition, controls were placed on the size of the Lahore army and thirty-six field guns were confiscated. The control of the rivers Sutlej and Beas and part of the Indus passed to the British, with the Provision that this was not to interfere with the passage of passenger boats owned by the Lahore Government. Also, provision was made for the separate sale of all the hilly regions between River Beas and Indus, including Kashmir, by the East India Company at a later date to Gulab Singh, the Raja of Jammu.

== Background ==
Maharaja Ranjit Singh Sukerchakia had made Lahore the capital of the Sikh Empire of the Punjab, which he built up between 1799 and his death in 1839. After his death, factions and assassinations destroyed the unity of the State, causing alarm to the British because it weakened the buffer against the perceived threat of invasion from the north. Provocative acts by both the British and the Sikhs escalated tension and, on 13 December 1845, Hardinge issued a proclamation declaring war on the Sikhs.

During the First Anglo-Sikh War, the British came close to defeat at the Battle of Ferozeshah, but were eventually victorious. After the defeat of the Sikhs at the Battle of Sobraon, the British marched unopposed into Lahore on 20 February 1846.

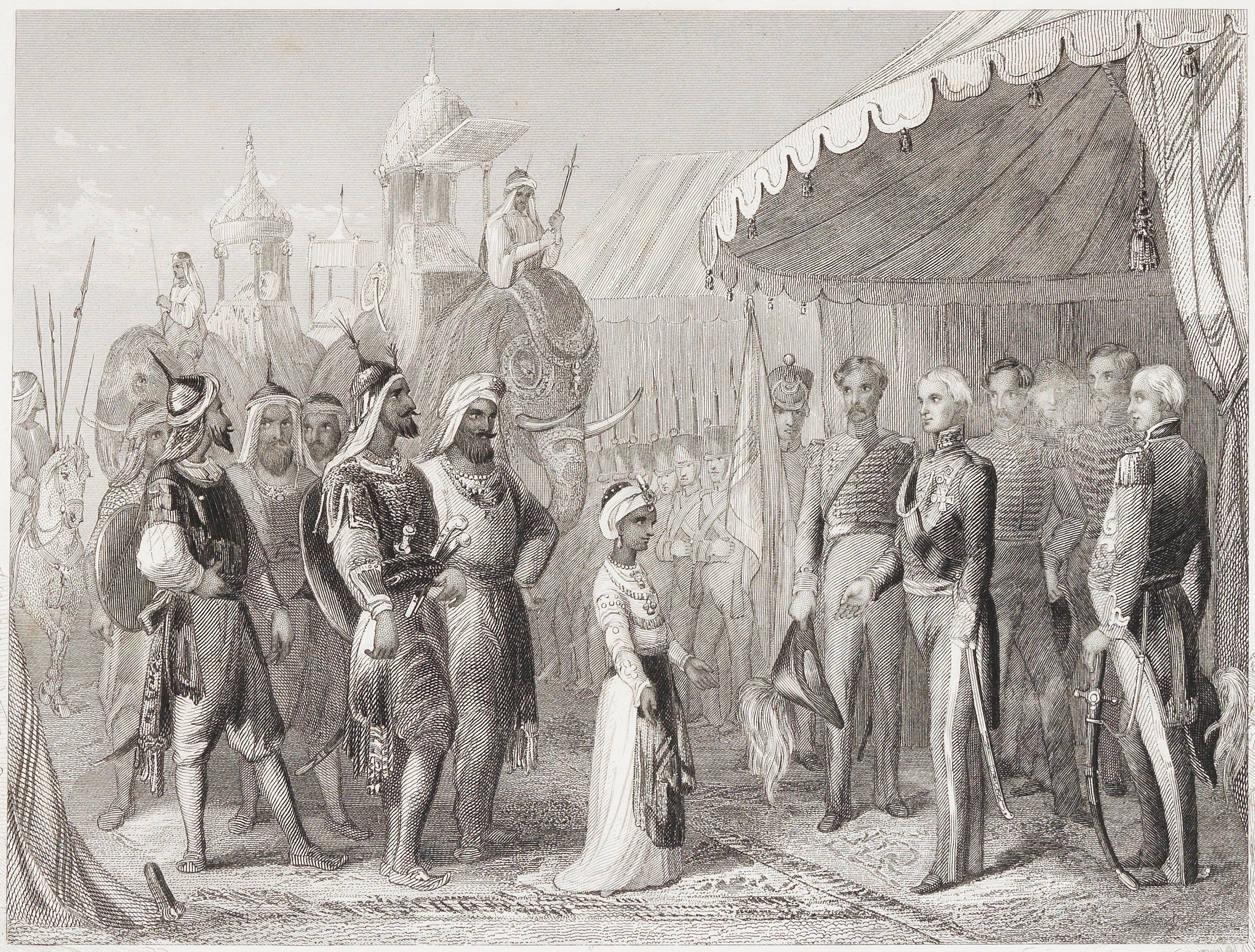
The surrender of Maharajah Duleep Singh to Sir Henry Hardinge, 1846. Drawn by Hablot K. Browne, Lahore, 1846

The peace was negotiated and drafted by Frederick Currie, assisted on military matters by Brevet-Major Henry Lawrence, acting under powers vested in them by Hardinge. Currie's diplomatic skills so impressed Hardinge that the British authorities rewarded him with a baronetcy in January 1847.

On 11 March 1846, two days after signature of the treaty, a supplement, comprising eight Articles of Agreement, was signed by the same parties. It provided that a British force would remain in Lahore until no longer than the end of the year "for the purpose of protecting the person of the Maharajah and the inhabitants of the city of Lahore, during the reorganization of the Sikh Army". This supplementary agreement was at the request of the Lahore Durbar. The Lahore army would vacate the city, convenient quarters would be provided for the British troops and the Lahore Government would pay the extra expenses.

The Agreement also provided that the British would respect the bona fide rights of jagirdars in the Lahore territories and would assist the Lahore Government in recovering the arrears of revenue justly due to the Lahore Government from the kardars and managers in the territories ceded by the provisions of Articles 3 and 4 of the Treaty.

== Treaty of Amritsar ==
The British demanded payment of 15 million rupees (one and a half crore) as reparations for the cost of the war. As the Lahore Government was unable to pay the whole of this sum immediately, it ceded some of the territories mentioned above, including Hazara and Kashmir, as equivalent to 10 million rupees (one crore). The Maharaja was also required to pay 6 million rupees (60 lakhs) immediately.

The British then sold Kashmir to the Raja of Jammu, Gulab Singh, for 7.5 million rupees (75 lakhs). The treaty of sale was concluded on 16 March 1846, in the Treaty of Amritsar and signed by Gulab Singh, Hardinge, Currie and Lawrence. Gulab Singh thus became the founder and first Maharaja of the princely state of Kashmir and Jammu.

== Treaty of Bhairowal ==
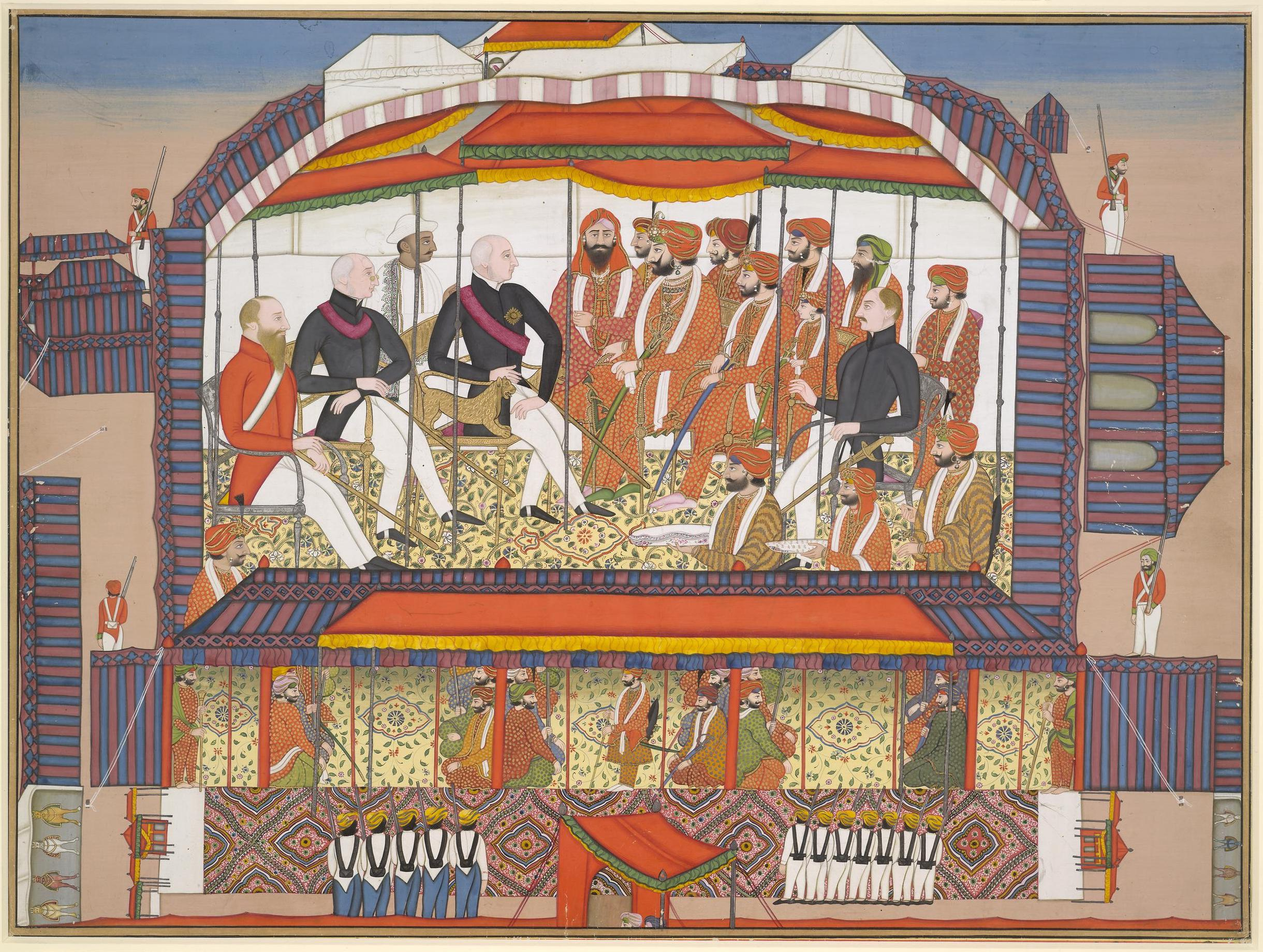
Painting of the signing of the Treaty of Bhairowal on 26 December 1846 between the Sikh Empire and British East India Company

The supplementary Articles of Agreement had specified that the British troops would remain in Lahore until no later than the end of 1846. When the time approached for the British to leave, the Durbar requested that the troops should remain until the Maharaja attained the age of 16. The British consented to this and new articles of agreement were drawn up, forming the Treaty of Bhairowal. This was signed on 26 December 1846, by Currie, Lawrence and 13 members of the Durbar and later ratified by Hardinge and the young Maharaja on the left bank of River Beas.. Actual location is Verowal district Tarn Taran in modern Panjab. (Location is confirmed in Sir HENRY HARDINGE's private correspondence and in testimony by an old Sikh person to Karam Singh historian in 1905 who was there during this treaty in Sikh Army. Details collected by Gurdev Singh Nagoke ) A key condition of the British agreement was that a Resident British officer, with an efficient establishment of assistants, was to be appointed by the Governor-General to remain at Lahore, with "full authority to direct and control all matters in every Department of the State". The Regent, Maharani Jindan Kaur, mother of the Maharaja, was awarded an annual pension of 150,000 rupees and replaced by a Council of Regency composed of leading Chiefs and Sirdars acting under the control and guidance of the British Resident. This effectively gave the British control of the Government.

== See also ==
- Treaty of Amritsar (1809)
