= Alfred Spencer Heathcote =

Recipient of the Victoria Cross (1832–1912)

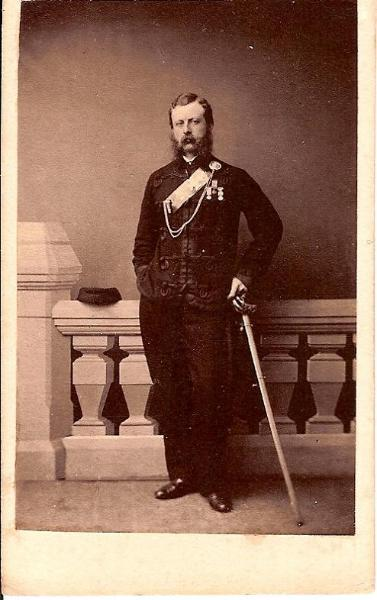
- Born: 29 March 1832; London, England
- Died: 21 February 1912 (aged 79); Bowral, Australia
- Burial place: St James Anglican Churchyard, Bowral
- Military career
- Allegiance: United Kingdom
- Branch: British Army
- Rank: Colonel
- Units: 60th Rifles
- Commands: Queensland Volunteer Cavalry Corps
- Conflicts: Indian Mutiny; Second Anglo-Chinese War
- Awards: Victoria Cross

Captain Alfred Spencer Heathcote VC (29 March 1832 – 21 February 1912) was a British army officer, who served in 60th Royal Rifles corps. He received the Victoria Cross for bravery in the Indian Rebellion of 1857 and was also awarded for his service in the Battle of Taku Forts.

== Early life and education ==
Heathcote was born in 1832 in Middlesex, the son of Henry Spencer Heathcote and Anne Currie, and nephew of Sir Frederick Currie, 1st Baronet and Vice-Admiral Mark John Currie. He was educated at Winchester College.

In his youth, he was a page-in-waiting to Queen Victoria.

== Military career ==
Heathcote served in the 60th Rifles corps of the British Army.

In 1857, Heathcote was 25 and a lieutenant when he fought in the Indian Mutiny and was awarded a Victorian Cross for bravery for his actions at the Siege of Delhi:

For highly gallant and daring conduct at Delhi throughout the Siege, from June to September, 1857, during which he was wounded. He volunteered for services of extreme danger, especially during the six days of severe fighting in the streets after the Assault. Elected by the Oflicers of his Regiment.

Heathcote also received a medal in 1860 for his service at the Battle of Taku Forts.

Heathcote resigned from the army in 1863 and sold his commission.

== Later life ==
Heathcote moved to Australia in 1864, where he invested unsuccessfully in land in Warwick, Queensland, Australia. In 1869, he was appointed the Warwick district registrar for births, deaths, and marriage.

He was later appointed infantry regiment commander in the Colony of New South Wales, appointed to command in August 1870 at Victoria Barracks, Sydney. He resigned after differences of opinion with Commandant Major-General Richardson. Heathcote served briefly as Clerk of Petty Sessions at Hill End.

Heathcote lived for a while in Orange, before a brief return to Sydney, finally settling in Bowral.

== Died ==
Heathcote died in Bowral on 21 February 1932 and was buried at Bowral Cemetery. He was survived by his wife, Mary Harriet Heathcote, whom he had married in 1859, one son and five daughters. His wife was later buried next to him. There is also a memorial for Heathcote at St. James' Anglican Church, Kings Street, Sydney, New South Wales.

== Legacy ==
Heathcote's Victoria Cross is displayed at the Victoria Barracks in Sydney.

== See also ==
- Heathcote (surname)
