= Mordaunt Currie =

Sir Walter Mordaunt Cyril Currie, 5th Baronet (3 June 1894 – 30 July 1978) was an early 20th-century poet who lived in Essex.

He wrote the lyrics for English composer Cecil Armstrong Gibbs's second symphony Odysseus, and lyrics for other religious and secular purposes.

His poem 'Perilous Ways' was set to music by the composer Martin Shaw.

== Books ==
Poetry publications include:

- Icarian Ways

Baronetage of the United Kingdom
Preceded by Walter Louis Rackham Currie	Baronet (of Wickham Bishops); 1941–1978	Succeeded by Alick Bradley Currie
