= Currie baronets =

Baronetcy in the Baronetage of the United Kingdom

- Escutcheon of the Currie baronets of Wickham Bishops
- Creation date: 1847
- Status: dormant

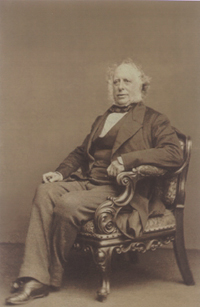
Sir Frederick Currie, 1st Baronet, in 1858

The Currie Baronetcy is a title in the Baronetage of the United Kingdom. It was created on 11 January 1847 for Frederick Currie, Foreign Secretary to the Indian Government and a member of the Supreme Council of India. He was a grandson of William Currie (1721–1781), nephew of William Currie (1756–1829), who was Member of Parliament for Upper Gatton and Winchelsea, and the brother of Vice-Admiral Mark John Currie.

== Currie baronets, of Wickham Bishops (1847) ==
- Sir Frederick Currie, 1st Baronet (1799–1875)
- Sir Frederick Larkins Currie, 2nd Baronet (1823–1900)
- Sir Frederick Reeve Currie, 3rd Baronet (1851–1930)
- Sir Walter Louis Rackham Currie, 4th Baronet (1856–1941)
- Sir (Walter) Mordaunt Cyril Currie, 5th Baronet (1894–1978)

=== Dormancy ===
- Alick Bradley Currie, presumed 6th Baronet (1904–1987). He was an American great-grandson of the 1st Baronet, the immediate line of descent having come to an end.
- Donald Scott Currie, presumed 7th Baronet (1930–2014), nephew of Alick Bradley Currie.
- Mark Donald Currie, presumed 8th Baronet (born 1970)

The presumed sixth Baronet was never on the Official Roll of the Baronetage which shows the baronetcy dormant since 1978 on the death of the 5th Baronet.

== Other family members ==
- Henry Currie, cousin of the first Baronet, was Member of Parliament for Guildford.
- The slaveholder Isaac Currie, uncle of the first Baronet, was the father of Raikes Currie, Member of Parliament for Northampton, who was the father of diplomat Philip Currie, 1st Baron Currie.
- Fendall Currie, sixth son of the first Baronet, was a Major-General in the Army.
- Frederick Alexander Currie (d. 1902), son of Major Mark Currie and grandson of the first Baronet, was a Lieutenant-Colonel in the Army.
