= Mark John Currie =

British Royal Navy admiral (1795–1874)

Vice-Admiral Mark John Currie
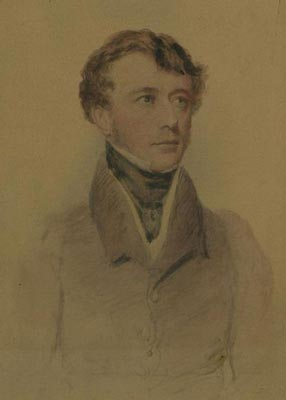
- Born: 21 June 1795; Upper Gatton, Surrey
- Died: 2 May 1874 (aged 78); Anerley, Crystal Palace, Surrey
- Relatives: brother Sir Frederick Currie, 1st Baronet nephew Alfred Spencer Heathcote VC
- Military career
- Allegiance: United Kingdom
- Branch: Royal Navy
- Rank: Vice-Admiral
- Commands: HMS Satellite

Vice-Admiral Mark John Currie played a significant role in the exploration of Australia and the foundation of the Swan River Colony, later named Western Australia.

He explored areas in New South Wales, after which he returned to a post in England. In 1829 he married and left three weeks later for Australia on the 443-ton Parmelia with his wife and servants, arriving at the coast of what was to become the Swan River settlement on 31 May 1829. Chief among the other passengers were Lieutenant Governor Captain James Stirling, Colonial Secretary Peter Brown, Surveyor-General Lieutenant John Septimus Roe, botanist James Drummond and their families.

The diaries and paintings by his wife, Jane Eliza Currie, provide a glimpse into the hard life of the first settlers. Her painting Panorama of the Swan River Settlement shows Fremantle in 1831. From it one can begin to appreciate the magnitude of the challenge faced by the colonists.

== Family background ==
Mark John was born on 21 June 1795, the second of eight children of Mark Currie, Esq. of Upper Gatton, Surrey, and Elizabeth (née Close) and he was educated at Charterhouse School. A portrait by Romney of his mother, entitled Mrs Mark Currie 1789, is in the Tate Gallery, London. His younger brother, Frederick was created 1st Baronet in 1847 for his services to the Government of India in negotiating the treaties of Lahore and Bhyrowal.

The family descended from the ancient Scots Corrie family of Annandale and the Western Isles, through Cuthbert Currie, a cadet living in Duns in the 16th century. It is not related to the Clan Currie created in the 18th century from a sept of the ancient Scots MacMhuirrich Clan.

Mark John married Jane Eliza née Wood on 14 January 1829. They had six children. The first two, Jane Eliza (17 January 1830) and Mark Riddell (17 August 1831) were born in the Swan River Colony. Charlotte (1833), Henrietta Blackwood (1834), Albert Purcell (12 September 1837) and Algernon (1840) were born in England.

== Career ==
=== Early days ===
He entered the Royal Navy as a Volunteer, First-Class, at age 12 on 29 April 1808, and was posted to Warspite under Captain Blackwood (later Vice-Admiral Sir Henry Blackwood). There he met James Stirling and the two became close and lifelong friends.

He was promoted to Lieutenant on 23 September 1813 and served on Centaur (1814/15), Rivoli (1816/17), Racehorse (1818), Nimrod (1820), Satellite (1821) and Leander (1821/22). He was promoted to Commander on 9 July 1823.

In 1822 and 1823, as commander of Satellite, he carried out surveys of channels and port entries on the coast of New South Wales and in 1822 commented critically on the penal colony at Newcastle, reporting "King Lash is master here". He was probably not referring directly to the Commandant of the colony, James Thomas Morisset, but to the number and harshness of the punishments he saw at the time of his visit.

Starting in May 1823, Currie, together with Brigade Major John Ovens and experienced bushman Joseph Wild explored the country east and south-west of Lake George in New South Wales. After crossing several rivers and the Goulburn plains they arrived at the east bank of the lake, at about 11 miles (18 km) north of the southern end. They struck south-south-east and then west across the Limestone Plains through an area ideal for settlement, now Canberra, to an area which Currie named Isabella's Plain after Isabella Brisbane, the infant daughter of the Governor, Sir Thomas Brisbane. Today this is a suburb in the Tuggeranong district of Canberra.

They came to the Murrumbidgee River and followed it in a southerly direction, crossing the Umaralla River thinking it to be the Murrumbidgee. There they came to fertile plains which they named Brisbane Downs. Today the aboriginal name Monaro has been restored to the region. It is likely that the fertility of these areas of New South Wales led him to underestimate the problems that were later faced in the Swan River Settlement.

When he was a midshipman he must have given a good account of himself because, when in 1827 Vice-Admiral Sir Henry Blackwood became Commander-in-Chief, The Nore, he appointed Currie as his Secretary. The Nore was a naval station at the mouth of the River Thames and for several hundred years one of the most important commands for the defence of the United Kingdom.

=== The Swan River Settlement ===
During most of the second half of 1828 Stirling was in London, vigorously promoting his dream of leading a settlement at the Swan River. Initial Government reaction was unfavourable, but his persistence and enthusiasm paid off and by November the scheme had support from Sir George Murray, Secretary for War and the Colonies, and had gained an unstoppable momentum. By this time the team of administrators had been decided and on 31 December 1828, Under Secretary Robert W Hay formally appointed Currie as Harbour Master for the new settlement, on no salary. Currie promptly married and on Sunday, 8 February 1829, he and his wife and their servants were on their way on board the Parmelia.

During the voyage Stirling started to make arrangements for the administration of the settlement. He formed "A Board of Counsel and Audit in the management of the property of the Crown and of public property within the Settlement" and on 16 May the Colonial Secretary, Peter Brown issued an instruction appointing Currie, Roe and the Registrar, William Stirling, to act as Commissioners of the Board. The document ended: "The duties of this office created by the appointment will be fully made known to you hereafter by the Instructions and References which you will occasionally receive. In the meantime I am to acquaint you that his Excellency expects from your zeal the performance of the service required of you without reward of remuneration beyond the satisfaction you will derive from the fulfilment of a duty of this confidential nature."

On 31 May the passengers had their first sight of the western coast of Australia. That night the Parmelia anchored off the west coast of Garden Island. The following day the plan was to anchor in Cockburn Sound, between Garden Island and the mainland, but a heavy swell prevented this and instead they anchored off Rottnest Island. On 2 June they made another attempt but, in Stirling's words "The Parmelia under my over-confident pilotage took the ground".

The next day Captain Charles Fremantle, who had been sent ahead in HMS Challenger to claim the colony for King George IV, and the combined efforts of the crews of both ships "extricated her from her perilous situation after she had received much damage". The need to repair the damage made it necessary for the livestock and the passengers and their property to be unloaded and landed on Garden Island.

Jane Currie's diary records "July 8, 1829 - Left the Parmelia. Dined at the Governor's. Slept under His Majesty's canvas, within our own walls". She lists their "stock, brought from the Cape and landed on Garden Island - Cow & calf, 4 Merinos, Sow, Goat & kid, 4 Ducks, 4 Drakes, 2 Cocks and 3 Hens - 3 couple Pigeons, 2½ couple Rabbits, 3 couple Guinea fowl." The families remained on Garden Island for the first few months while the menfolk explored the mainland. Soon after arrival Currie, on the Governor's pony, was declared the winner of the colony's first unofficial horse race, held on the shore of Garden Island.

Currie made three expeditions south of the Swan during 1829. In July he led an exploration south of Fremantle. He was accompanied by botanist James Drummond, Dr Simmons and Lieut. George Griffin. From the coast at the present day town of Rockingham they moved inland and climbed a small hill, now named Baldivis. From the summit of this hill they could see a course of water, that Currie later referred to as the Serpentine. This name first appeared on a map published by the Royal Geographical Society in 1832. At one time this river was mistaken for the Murray River.

The first task of the administrators was to find a site for the principal town. A location on the Swan River was selected and on 12 August Helen Dance, wife of Captain William Dance of HMS Sulphur, ceremoniously cut a tree to mark the foundation of Perth. Currie was present at the ceremony and later the same day took up his duties, at a salary of 100 pounds, as the first Harbour Master of Fremantle, responsible for pilotage and services at the port.

A tent was erected "for the despatch of business" on the site chosen for the town. This was to provide offices for the Colonial Secretary, the Surveyor General, the Harbour Master, the Civil Engineer and the Commissioners of the Board of Counsel and Audit. Later that year, Currie decided it would be more convenient to make his office as Harbour Master and Postmaster on board the wreck of the Marquis of Anglesea, which had been swept ashore in a gale on 23 August 1829. The wreck is visible in Jane Currie's Panorama of the Swan River Settlement.

Currie became the Swan River Colony's first Auditor, appointed 1 July 1831, at a salary of 300 pounds "because his ability, intelligence and Integrity render him far more valuable to the public in that capacity than as Harbour Master". He was made responsible to the Colonial Office through the Governor.

On 6 February 1832, empowered by Parliament through the Order-in-Council officially constituting the colony, a legislative council was formed, comprising the governor, the Senior Military Officer, the Colonial Secretary, the Surveyor-General and the Advocate-General. On his own initiative Stirling added Currie to the list as clerk to the council, as he "could not find within the colony a person better calculated than the gentleman who now fills it".

This was high praise, but wasted, because later that year Currie wrote to Peter Brown requesting that the Governor grant him leave of absence "to proceed thither" to England because of "urgent private affairs". This was granted on 26 June and on 12 August, the third anniversary of the Foundation of Perth, Currie and his family left the colony on Sulphur, not to return. However, two of his servants, Frederick and Mildred (Kitty) Ludlow, remained. In 1834 Ludlow kept a diary of a journey from Augusta to Perth and is credited with the discovery of the Capel River.

=== Land development ===
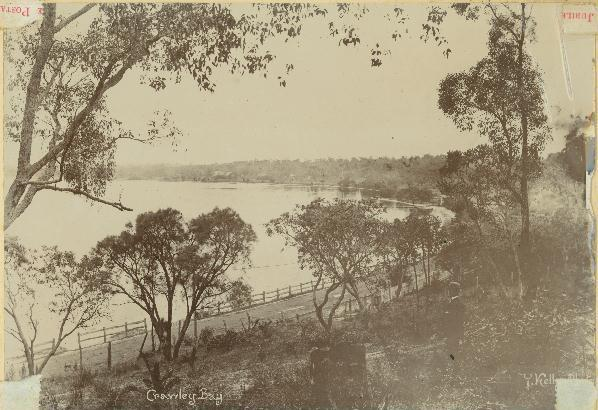
Crawley Bay in the 1890s. Originally part of Currie's land grant, it was later sold to Henry Sutherland and in 1910 acquired by the state. In 1922 it was vested in the University of Western Australia.

Currie was allotted a 32-acre (130,000 m^{2}) grant of land 3 miles (4.8 km) south-west of the present centre of Perth, alongside a wide point in the Swan River known then as Eliza Bay and Point Currie. The Curries left Garden Island on 2 November to set up their tent on their allotment.

After Currie left the colony he sold this grant to Henry Sutherland, the Assistant Surveyor, who later changed the name to Crawley Bay after his mother's maiden name.

Later still it became Matilda Bay, to honour Matilda Roe, the wife of the Surveyor General.

In 1910, the site was acquired by the state and today is the campus of the University of Western Australia.

Point Currie, also known as Pelican Point and J H Abraham's Reserve, is today the home of the Royal Perth Yacht Club, the Mounts Bay Sailing Club and the 1st Pelican Point Sea Scouts.

A later settlement was alongside the Swan, 5 miles (8.0 km) north of east of the centre of Perth. Here, early in 1831, he built a brick homestead, near the present day Water Street, which he named Redcliff, after the steep red clay banks of the river. Today the area is part of the suburb Redcliffe. A further grant was located about 6 miles (9.7 km) north-west of Beverley at the junction of the Avon River and Dale River, adjoining a grant made to Stirling. Currie's and Stirling's grants were combined in 1849 to form the Avondale Estate. In 1901, it was acquired by the state, and is now the site of the Avondale Agricultural Research Station.

Jane Brook, a suburb of the town of Swan about 14 miles (23 km) north-east of Perth, takes its name from the brook, a tributary of the Swan River. Stirling named this Jane Brook, in Jane Currie's honour.

=== Later career ===
He was promoted to Post Captain in 1841.

In January 1854, Rear Admiral Sir James Stirling was appointed Commander-in-Chief China and the East Indies Station and immediately wrote to the Admiralty applying for Currie to be his secretary. They arrived in Hong Kong on 11 May and the Admiral's flag was transferred to Winchester. Two weeks later news was received from England that war had been declared on Russia.

The next day the Winchester led a small squadron northwards along the Chinese coast to make a show of strength and 'to prevent Russian ships of war and their prizes from making use of (Japanese) ports'. Stirling's letters and Currie's diaries record the patient and tactful negotiations with the Governor of Nagasaki to achieve this aim and the events leading up to Stirling signing the first Anglo-Japanese Friendship Treaty.

He received two further promotions, to Rear Admiral on the Reserved List in 1862 and to Vice-Admiral in 1867.

Vice-Admiral Mark John Currie died on 2 May 1874, in Thicket Road, Anerley, Crystal Palace, Surrey. Jane Eliza Currie survived him by two years. In the 1871 British Census she is recorded at 193 Clifton Villas, Beckenham, Kent, on a visit to her daughter Jane Eliza Macrae, who married Robert Campbell Macrae in 1854 and had eight children, the eldest of whom, Mark, later lived at Cranbrook Road, Rose Bay, New South Wales.
