= Fred Curry (disambiguation) =

Frederick Curry may refer to:

- Fred Curry, American professional wrestler
- Fred Curry (politician)

== See also ==
- Frederick Currie (disambiguation)
- Frederick Currey, English rugby player
- Frederick Currey (mycologist) (1819–1881), English mycologist and botanist
- Curry (surname)
- Currie (surname)
