= John Maud (bishop) =

English bishop (1860–1932)

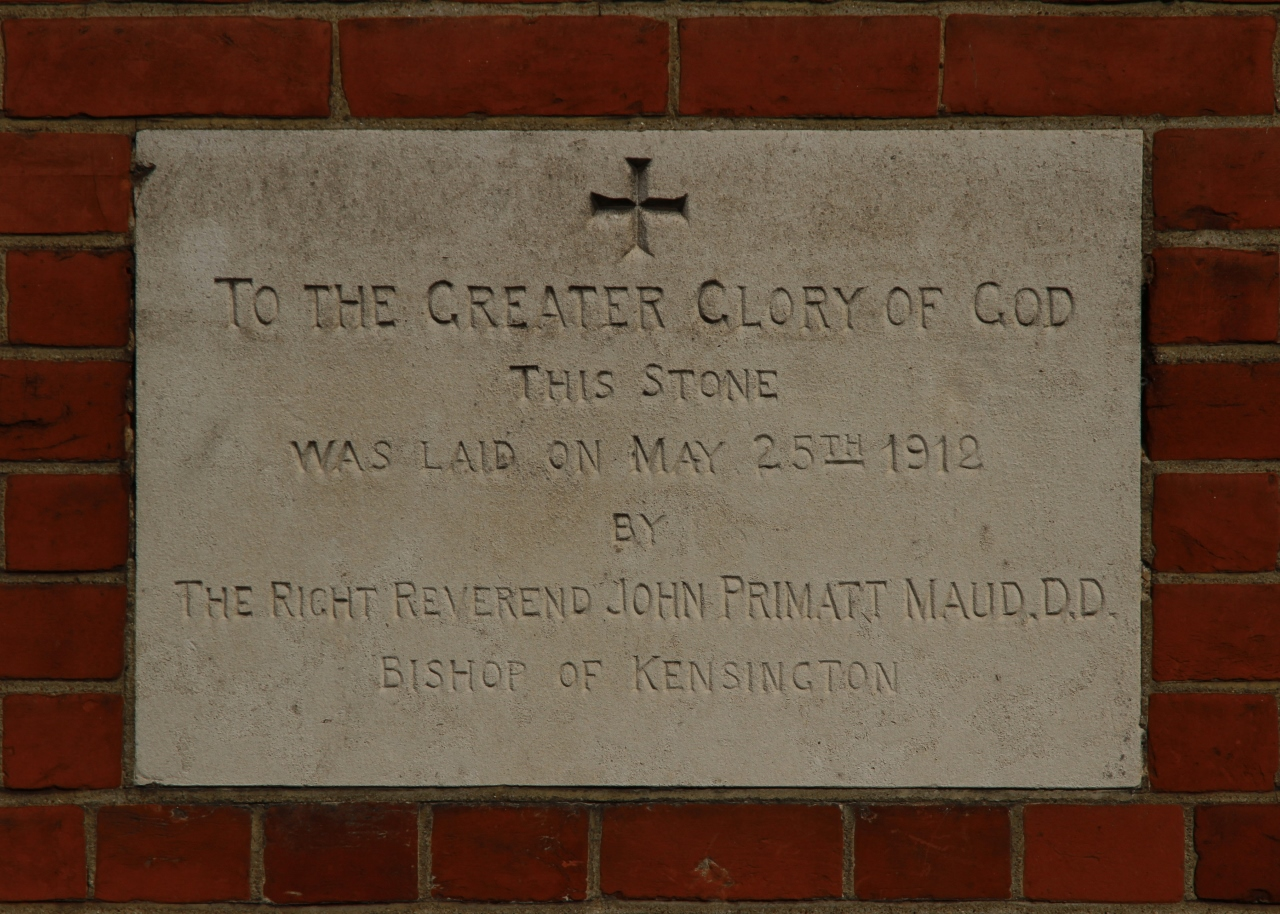
A foundation stone laid by John Maud in 1912 at St Hilda's parish church, Ashford, Middlesex (now Surrey)

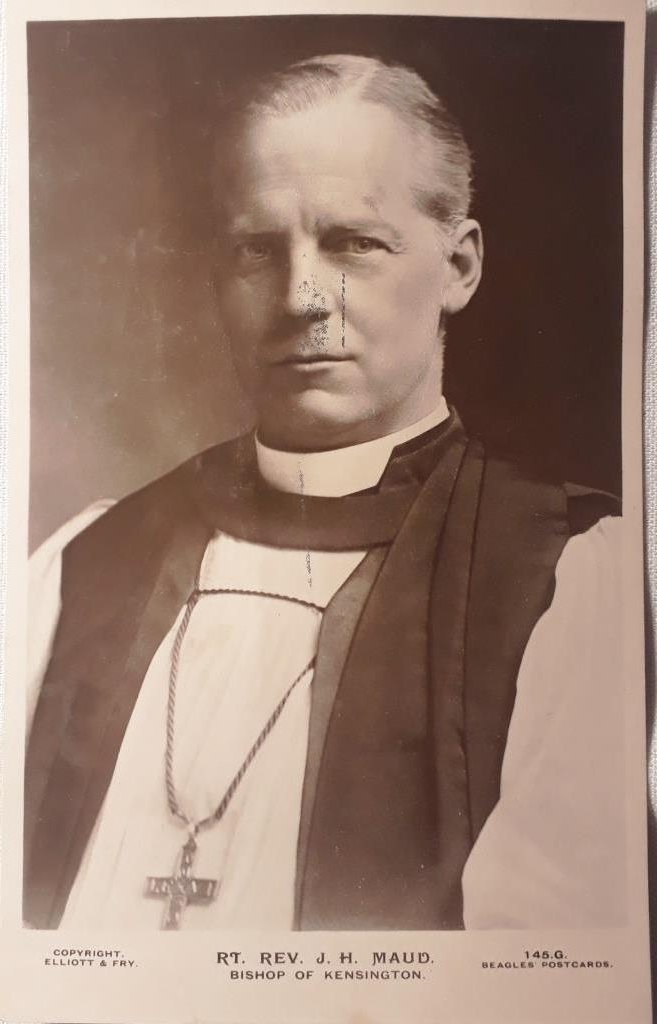
Maud, Bishop of Kensington

John Primatt Maud (13 June 1860 – 21 March 1932) was the second Bishop of Kensington from 1911 until his death 21 years later. He was born on 13 June 1860 and educated at Keble College, Oxford.

Maud was ordained in 1887 and his first appointment was a curacy at St John the Evangelist, Westminster. He was Vicar at Chapel Allerton, Leeds from 1890 and at St Mary Redcliffe, 1904–11. He was consecrated a bishop on the Feast of the Holy Innocents 1911 (28 December), at St Paul's Cathedral, by Randall Davidson, Archbishop of Canterbury. He served as Bishop of Kensington — the suffragan bishop to the Bishop of London with delegated responsibility for "West London" — until he died in post on 21 March 1932 aged 71.

Maud's son John Lord Redcliffe-Maud had a distinguished career.

Church of England titles
Preceded by Frederick Ridgeway	Bishop of Kensington; 1911–1932	Succeeded by Bertram Simpson
