= Treaty of Amritsar (1846) =

1846 treaty between the East India Company and Jammu

The Treaty of Amritsar, executed by the British East India Company and Raja Gulab Singh of Jammu after the First Anglo-Sikh War, established the princely state of Jammu and Kashmir under the suzerainty of the British Indian Empire.

== Background ==
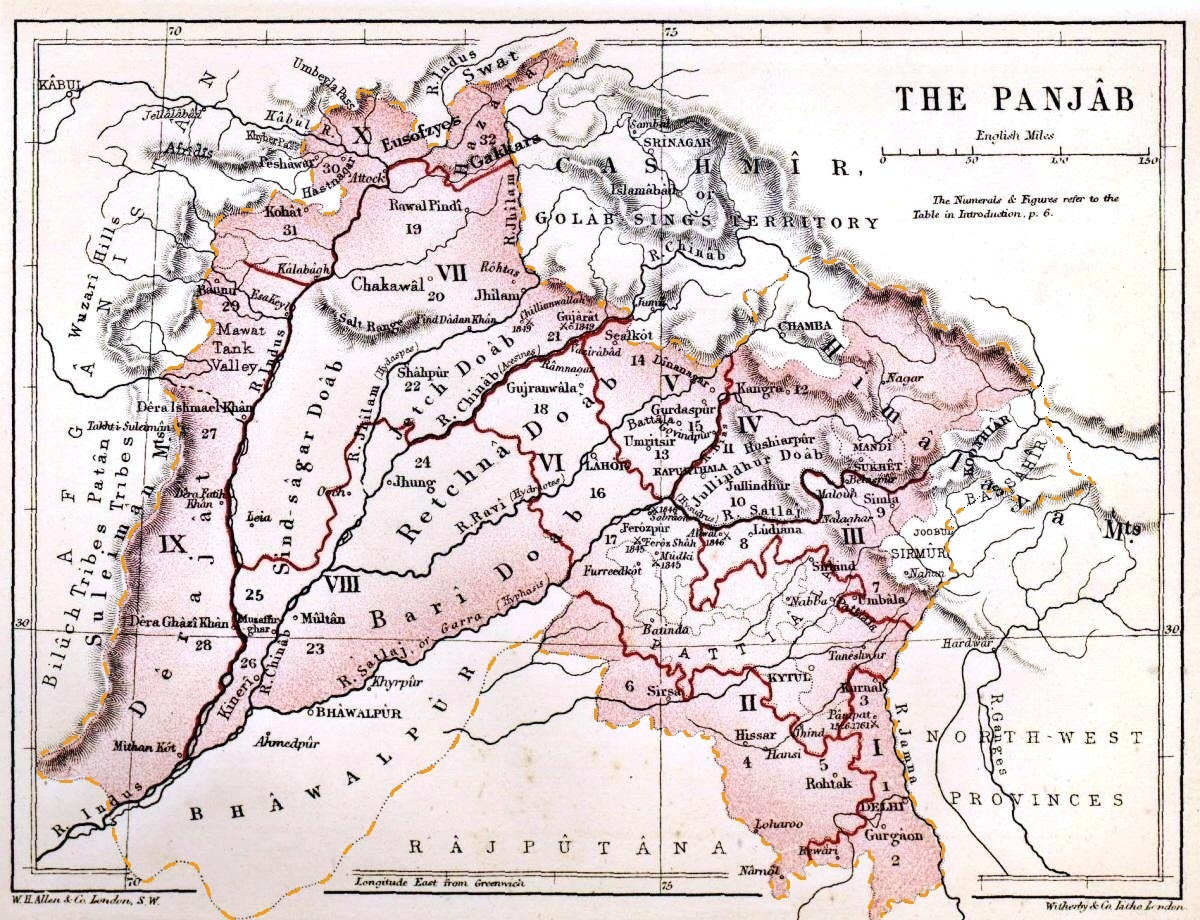
The Punjab region and the territory ceded to Raja Gulab Singh. The rivers marked are Indus, Jhelum, Chenab, Ravi, Beas and Sutlej (from the north to south).

The Battle of Sobraon in the First Anglo-Sikh War proved to be a decisive victory for the British East India Company over the Sikh Empire, inducing the Sikhs to sue for peace. Raja Gulab Singh, (Note: Gulab Singh was a Dogra Rajput, not a Sikh. The syncretic empire built by Maharaja Ranjit Singh had a place for all communities at high positions.) acting as the Wazir of the Sikh Empire, negotiated the terms of peace, which included the cession of the territory between the Sutlej and Beas, payment of 1.5 crore (Note: 1.5 crore is 15 million. (A crore is 10 million, whereas a lakh is a tenth of a million.)) rupees in indemnity, and a drastic reduction in the Sikh army.

After the agreement was reached, the British Governor-General marched to Lahore on 20 February 1846. Soon afterwards, Rani Jindan, the queen mother and regent of the Sikh Empire, replaced Gulab Singh with Lal Singh as the Wazir. Lal Singh informed the British that the Sikh Darbar had the resources to pay only 0.5 crore (50 lakhs) in cash, and offered territory in lieu of the remaining one crore indemnity, suggesting the territories then under Gulab Singh's control. The British, on the other hand, asked for the entire hilly region between Beas and Indus, including the Kashmir Valley, in lieu of one crore.

The plan of Lal Singh and Rani Jindan may have been to relieve Gulab Singh of his territories and reduce his power. However, Gulab Singh had built strong relations with the British. The Governor-General offered to recognise him as an independent sovereign of the ceded territories if he paid the indemnity due from the Sikhs, to which Gulab Singh agreed. These arrangements were formalised in the Anglo-Sikh Treaty (the Treaty of Lahore), Article XII of which stipulated that the Sikh Empire would recognise the "independent sovereignty" of Gulab Singh in whatever territories the British might offer to him via a separate treaty.

In the end, the British decided to keep the territory between Beas and Ravi rivers to themselves, which included the Kullu Valley with forts such as Kangra and Noorpur. The remaining hilly territory between Ravi and Indus rivers was granted to Gulab Singh for a reduced payment of 0.75 crore (75 lakhs). These territories, with some later adjustments, became the princely state of Jammu and Kashmir under British suzerainty. Gulab Singh and his descendants were recognised as the "Maharajas" of the princely state, until the accession to the Union of India in 1947.

== Description ==
The Treaty of Amritsar was executed on 16 March 1846. It formalised the arrangements between the British East India Company and Raja Gulab Singh of Jammu in the sequel to the Treaty of Lahore. By Article 1 of the treaty, Gulab Singh acquired "all the hilly or mountainous country with its dependencies situated to the eastward of the River Indus and the westward of the River Ravi including Chamba and excluding Lahul, being part of the territories ceded to the British Government by the Lahore State according to the provisions of Article IV of the Treaty of Lahore, dated 9th March, 1846." Under Article 3, Gulab Singh was to pay 75 lakhs (7.5 million) of Nanak Shahi rupees (the ruling currency of the Sikh Empire) to the British Government, along with other annual tributes. The Treaty of Amritsar marked the beginning of Dogra rule in Kashmir.

== Text of the treaty ==
Following is the detailed treaty of Amritsar:

Treaty of Amritsar March 16, 1846

The treaty between the British Government on the one part and Maharajah Gulab Singh of Jammu on the other concluded on the part of the British Government by Frederick Currie, Esq. and Brevet-Major Henry Montgomery Lawrence, acting under the orders of the Rt. Hon. Sir Henry Hardinge, G.C.B., one of her Britannic Majesty's most Honorable Privy Council, Governor-General of the possessions of the East India Company, to direct and control all the affairs in the East Indies and by Maharajah Gulab Singh in person - 1846.

Article 1 The British Government transfers and makes over for ever in independent possession to Maharajah Gulab Singh and the heirs male of his body all the hilly or mountainous country with its dependencies situated to the eastward of the River Indus and the westward of the River Ravi including Chamba and excluding Lahol, being part of the territories ceded to the British Government by the Lahore State according to the provisions of Article IV of the Treaty of Lahore, dated 9 March 1846.

Article 2 The eastern boundary of the tract transferred by the foregoing article to Maharajah Gulab Singh shall be laid down by the Commissioners appointed by the British Government and Maharajah Gulab Singh respectively for that purpose and shall be defined in a separate engagement after survey.

Article 3 In consideration of the transfer made to him and his heirs by the provisions of the foregoing article Maharajah Gulab Singh will pay to the British Government the sum of seventy-five lakhs of rupees (Nanukshahee), fifty lakhs to be paid on or before the 1st October of the current year, A.D., 1846.

Article 4 The limits of territories of Maharajah Gulab Singh shall not be at any time changed without concurrence of the British Government.

Article 5 Maharajah Gulab Singh will refer to the arbitration of the British Government any disputes or question that may arise between himself and the Government of Lahore or any other neighboring State, and will abide by the decision of the British Government.

Article 6 Maharajah Gulab Singh engages for himself and heirs to join, with the whole of his Military Forces, the British troops when employed within the hills or in the territories adjoining his possessions.

Article 7 Maharajah Gulab Singh engages never to take to retain in his service any British subject nor the subject of any European or American State without the consent of the British Government.

Article 8 Maharajah Gulab Singh engages to respect in regard to the territory transferred to him, the provisions of Articles V, VI and VII of the separate Engagement between the British Government and the Lahore Durbar, dated 11 March 1846.

Article 9 The British Government will give its aid to Maharajah Gulab Singh in protecting his territories from external enemies.

Article 10 Maharajah Gulab Singh acknowledges the supremacy of the British Government and will in token of such supremacy present annually to the British Government one horse, twelve shawl goats of approved breed (six male and six female) and three pairs of Cashmere shawls.

This Treaty of ten articles has been this day settled by Frederick Currie, Esq. and Brever-Major Henry Montgomery Lawrence, acting under directions of the Rt. Hon. Sir Henry Hardinge, Governor-General, on the part of the British Government and by Maharajah Gulab Singh in person, and the said Treaty has been this day ratified by the seal of the Rt. Hon. Sir Henry Hardinge, Governor-General. Done at Amritsar the sixteenth day of March, in the year of our Lord one thousand eight hundred and forty-six, corresponding with the seventeenth day of Rubee-ul-Awal (1262 Hijri).

(Signed) H. Hardinge (Seal) (Signed) F. Currie

(Signed) H. M. Lawrence

== Aftermath ==
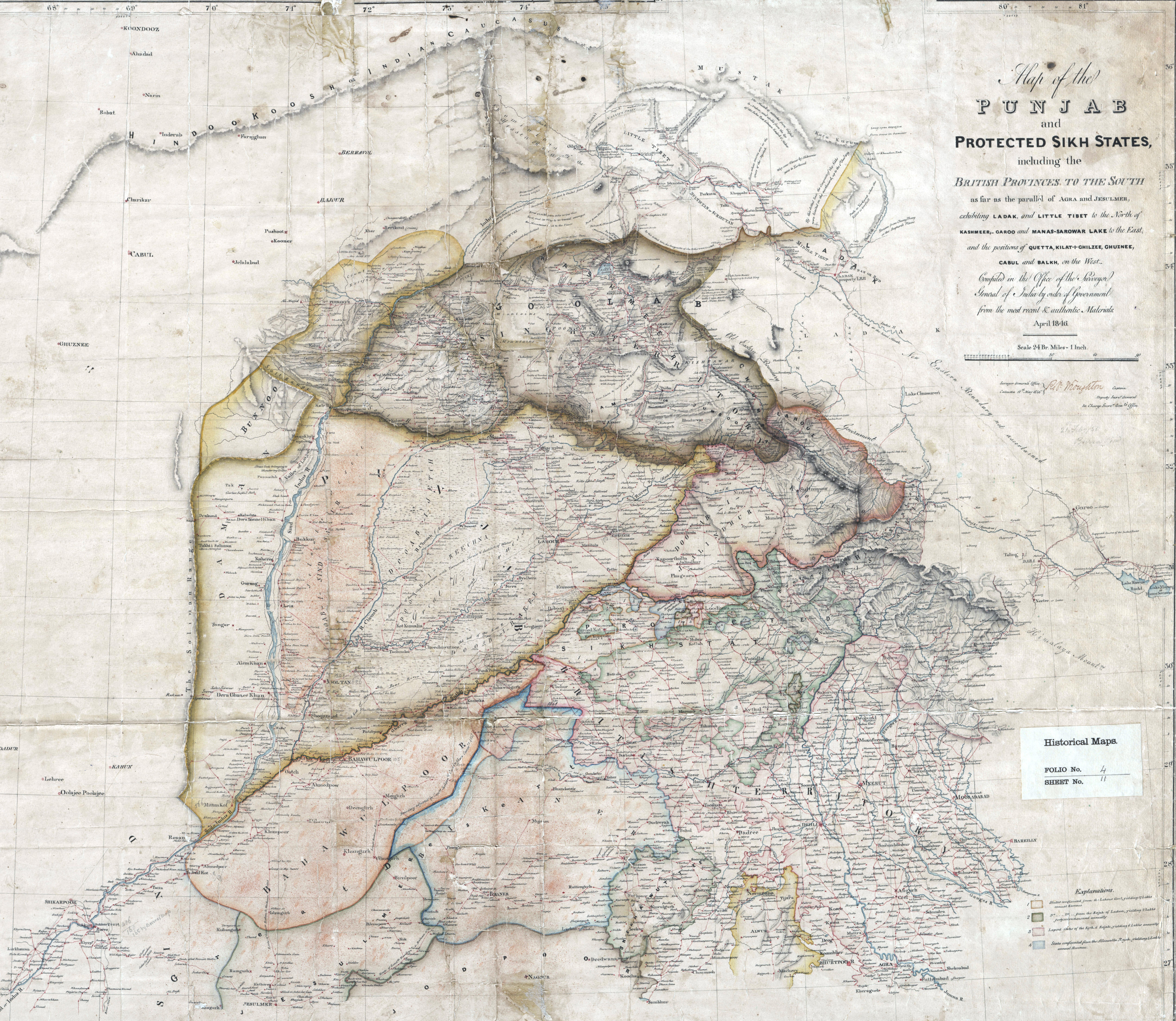
1846 showing the territory of Gulab Singh, including Hazara & Punjab (Lahore Durbar)

=== Hazara dispute ===
Following the Treaty of Amritsar, the British transferred Kashmir and its dependencies to Raja Gulab Singh in exchange for a payment of 75 lakh rupees. The treaty broadly defined the transferred region as "all the hilly or mountainous country with its dependencies situated eastward of the Indus and westward of the Ravi," which included the Hazara region.

In May 1846, Gulab Singh's official, Diwan Hari Chand, entered Lower Hazara via Khanpur and began collecting revenue on behalf of the Dogra state. While some local chiefs submitted peacefully—such as Raja Haidar Bakhsh of the Gakkhar clan—others, particularly Pashtun and Hindustani elements in Upper Hazara, resisted Dogra rule. The situation deteriorated into widespread disorder by late 1846. In response, a combined force under British supervision, including Lieutenant Lumsden, Mr. Vans Agnew, and local assistants, marched from

Military map of the Hazara region, surveyed by D. G. Robinson in 1848–49

Srinagar via Muzaffarabad to subdue the revolt. A key engagement occurred at the Dub Pass above Garhi Habibullah on 6 January 1847, after which the main tribal opposition was suppressed.

Despite these operations, Gulab Singh found Hazara increasingly difficult to govern due to its complex tribal structure, geography, and resistance to Dogra authority. Consequently, in early 1847, Gulab Singh ceded Hazara back to the Lahore Darbār (then under British Infulance after first anglo sikh war) in exchange for territory near Jammu, the exchange was valued at half the worth of Hazara, and included an equitable adjustment of jagirs and rent-free holdings. The returned land was located on the opposite side of the Jhelum River, closer to Gulab Singh’s existing dominions. They were the talukas of Kathua and Suchetgarh, along with part of Minawar.

=== Chamba dispute ===
Another dispute arose over whether Gulab Singh's new state included the entire Chamba region, especially areas on both sides of the Ravi River. Gulab Singh already held Lakhanpur, which the British had taken under the treaty, while the Raja of Chamba claimed Bhadrawah as granted earlier by Ranjit Singh. He also opposed falling under Gulab Singh’s rule, having previously paid tribute to the Sikh Empire. In 1847, Colonel Henry Lawrence mediated a settlement between Chamba, Kashmir, and the British. Under the agreement, Kashmir retained Bhadrawah, Lakhanpur, and Chandgraon; Chamba became independent of Kashmir; and the Raja accepted British suzerainty, ending ties to both Lahore and Kashmir rulers.

=== Hill chiefs dispute ===
In 1847, the British took control of the Sujanpur part of pathankot and some land between the Chaki and Beas rivers from Gulab Singh. This was done to cover the costs of supporting several hill chiefs who had left Kashmir and settled in British-controlled areas.

== Agreement between the Lahore and Kashmir Darbars (1847) ==
In 1847, an agreement was made between the Governments of Lahore and Jammu. It was signed by Dewan Dina Nath and Rai Kishen Chand for Maharaja Duleep Singh of Lahore, and by Dewan Jowala Sahai and Qazi Mohkam-ud-din for Maharaja Gulab Singh of Jammu. The agreement was made in the presence of Lieutenant-Colonel Henry Lawrence, who was the British Agent to the Governor-General and Resident at Lahore, and was subject to the approval of the Governor-General of India.

The agreement concerned the exchange of the districts of Hazara, Pakhli, and Kahuta—located west of the River Jhelum—for lands lying east of the Jhelum in the direction of Jammu. It was agreed that Captain J. Abbott, appointed as Boundary Commissioner, would examine the revenue records of the territory west of the Jhelum. After excluding jagirs and rent-free lands, he was to determine the yearly rent. Jammu would receive lands from the Lahore territory producing half of that rent value. Captain Abbott was then to demarcate a well-defined boundary to prevent future disputes. The boundary was to run west of the Jhelum River up to the border of Muzaffarabad, follow the Kishanganga (Karnah) River to a point determined by him, and then proceed via a clear and distinct line to the Indus River. Once the boundary was set, the mutual exchange of territories would be carried out. Both parties agreed to abide permanently by the terms of the agreement. Any future disputes would be referred to the Agent of the Governor-General, North-Western Frontier.

The agreement was signed in the presence of Lieutenant-Colonel Lawrence and required confirmation by the Governor-General of India. Copies of the agreement were to be delivered to both Darbars, and one was to be retained in the Agency Office.

- Dewan Jowala Sahai, Dewan Dina Nath Qazi, Mohkam-ud-din, Rai Kishen Chand
- H. M. Lawrence, Agent to the Governor-General and Resident at Lahore

== See also ==
- Treaty of Lahore
- List of treaties

== Bibliography ==
- Khilnani, N. M. (1972), British Power in the Punjab, 1839–1858, London: Asia Publishing House – via archive.org
- Panikkar, K. M. (1930), Gulab Singh, London: Martin Hopkinson Ltd – via archive.org
- Satinder Singh, Bawa (1974), The Jammu Fox: A biography of Maharaja Gulab Singh of Kashmir, 1792-1857, Southern Illinois University Press, ISBN 978-0-8093-0652-7
