= Sir Frederick Currie, 1st Baronet =

Sir Frederick Currie Bt.
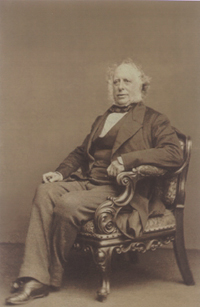
- Sir Frederick Currie, 1858
- Born: 3 February 1799; Bloomsbury, London
- Died: 11 September 1875 (aged 76); St Leonards, Sussex, England
- Occupation: diplomat

Sir Frederick Currie, 1st Baronet (3 February 1799 – 11 September 1875) was a British diplomat, who had a career in the British East India Company and the Indian Civil Service. His posts included Foreign Secretary to the Government of India, Member of the Supreme Council of India, Resident at Lahore and Chairman of the East India Company.

He acted as an agent for the Governor-General, Sir Henry Hardinge, during the First Anglo-Sikh War of 1845-6 and was rewarded with a baronetcy in 1847 for his assistance in negotiating the Treaties of Lahore and Bhyrowal.

== Family background ==
Currie was born on 3 February 1799 in Bloomsbury, Central London, the third of eight children of the brewer and banker Mark Currie of Upper Gatton, Surrey, and Elizabeth Currie née Close. The politician William Currie of East Horsley was his uncle and the diplomat Philip Currie, 1st Baron Currie, his first cousin, once removed. The Curries belonged to an old Scottish family descended directly from the Curries of Duns, Berwickshire, in the late 16th century and, via a cadet, from the Corrie/Currie family of Annandale, Dumfriesshire, in the 12th century.

Two younger brothers, Edward and Albert Peter, were also in the Bengal Civil Service and his elder brother Mark John Currie was a founder settler/administrator of Western Australia and Vice-Admiral, Royal Navy.

== Career ==
=== Early days ===
He was at school at Charterhouse until at the age of 16 he entered the East India Company College at Haileybury.

He arrived in Bengal in 1820 and after a number of minor judicial and revenue posts in the Gorakhpur district he became in 1835 Commissioner of the Benares Division. In 1840 he was selected to be a judge at Allahabad.

He was appointed Foreign Secretary to the Government of India in 1844 and in that post negotiated the 1846 treaties of Lahore, Amritsar and Bhyroval with the Sikhs at the end of the First Anglo-Sikh War.

=== The First Anglo-Sikh War and the Treaties of Lahore and Bhyroval ===
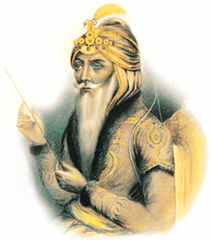
Maharaja Ranjit Singh

During the reign of Maharaja Ranjit Singh the British were discouraged from attacking the Sikh Empire of the Punjab by the Maharaja's diplomatic skills, popularity and 35,000 strong united Sikh Khalsa Army. In the years following his death in 1839, assassinations, weak government and warring factions provided the British with an argument and opportunity to invade. In 1842 a new Governor-General, Lord Ellenborough, began preparations for war and in 1844 his successor, Sir Henry Hardinge, a veteran of the Peninsular War under Sir Arthur Wellesley, accelerated these preparations.

As foreign secretary, Currie fell in with the designs of Ellenborough and Hardinge and supported the actions against the Sikhs in 1845 of the British Representative to the Punjab, Major George Broadfoot. The resultant provocative acts on both sides led to military escalation and on 13 December 1845 Hardinge issued a proclamation declaring war on the Sikhs. During the war Currie accompanied Hardinge, who despite his seniority as Governor-General volunteered to act as second-in-command under Sir Hugh Gough, another veteran of the Peninsular war.

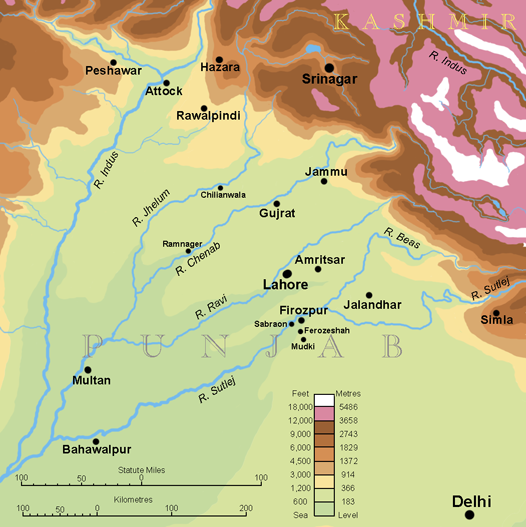

The war was short. The first battle, at Mudki on 18 December, was brief and indecisive. The Battle of Ferozeshah three days later was nearly a disastrous defeat for the British, and Hardinge instructed Currie to destroy the state papers in the event of a defeat, to prevent them falling into the hands of the Sikhs. However Tej Singh, commanding the Sikh army, did not press home his advantage when the British were at his mercy. After this there was a temporary reduction of hostilities while the British waited for reinforcements. The last battle of the campaign took place at Sabhraon on 10 February 1846. The Sikhs were decisively defeated. Gough, paying tribute to their gallantry, wrote to Sir Robert Peel, the British Prime Minister, "...I could have wept to have witnessed the fearful slaughter of so devoted a body of men".

Hardinge entered the Sikh capital Lahore on 20 February and Currie, assisted on military matters by Brevet-Major Henry Lawrence, arranged the terms of surrender. Currie led the negotiations, but did not determine the content of either of the two treaties which formed the Treaty of Lahore, signed by Hardinge on 9 and 11 March 1846. However his diplomatic skills so impressed Hardinge that he urged the home authorities to reward Currie with a baronetcy, a request which was granted in January 1847. The terms of the Treaty were punitive. Sikh territory was reduced to a fraction of its former size, losing Jammu, Kashmir, Hazara, the territory to the south of the river Sutlej and the forts and territory in the Jalandhar Doab between the rivers Sutlej and Beas.

In consideration of the help Raja Gulab Singh of Jammu had given the British during the war and in restoring amicable relations after the war, he was to be recognised, under Article 12 of the 9 March Treaty, as independent sovereign "in such territories and districts in the hills as may be made over to the said Rajah Golab Sing by separate agreement between himself and the British Government". On 16 March, this separate agreement was signed by Currie and Lawrence, forming the Treaty of Amritsar, in which Kashmir was sold by the British Government to Gulab Singh for 7,500,000 rupees (75 lakhs Nanak Shahi). In acknowledgement of the supremacy of the British Government Gulab Singh agreed to make an annual present to the British of "one horse, twelve perfect shawl goats of approved breed (six male and six female), and three pairs of Cashmere shawls".

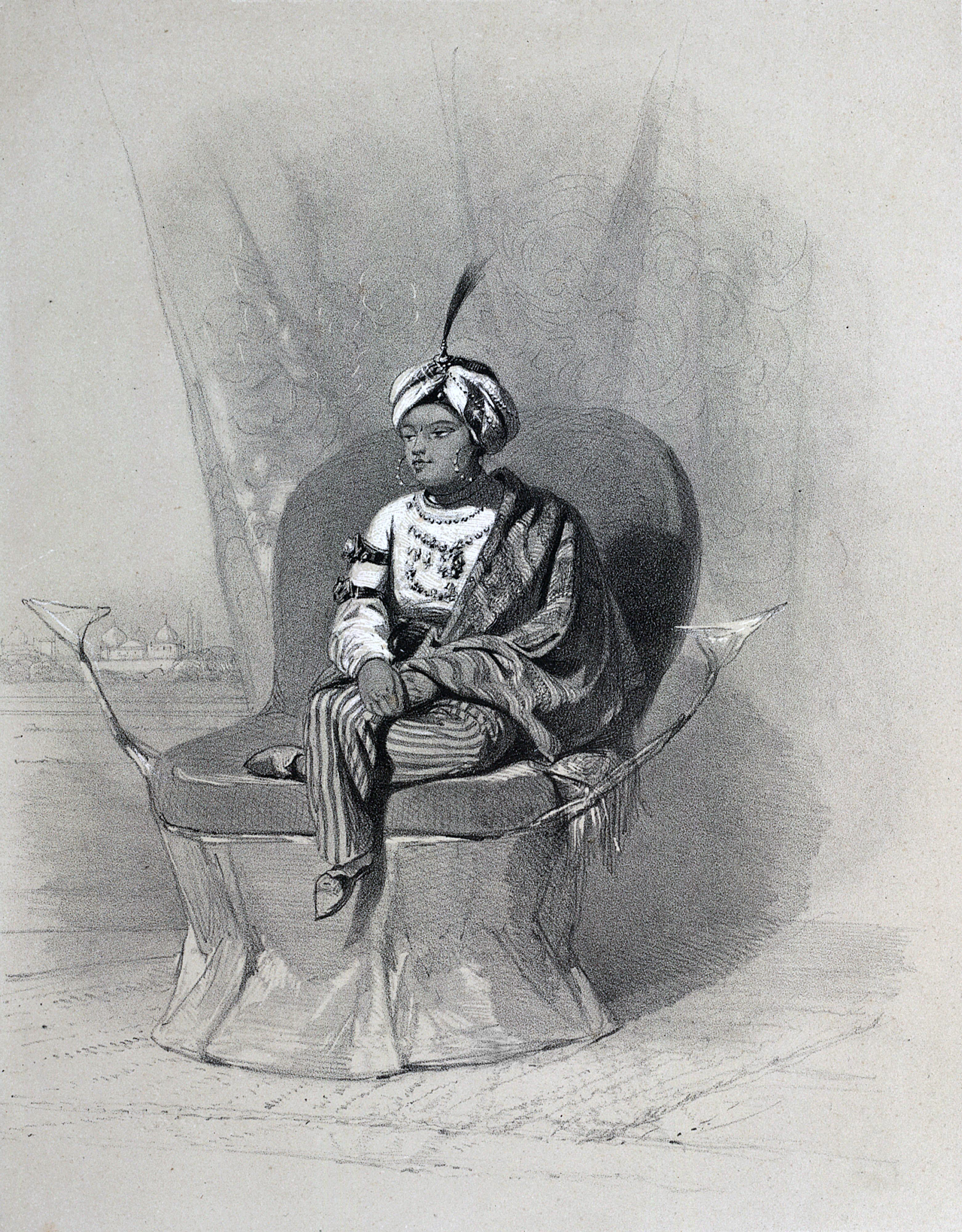
The young Maharaja Duleep Singh.

The terms of the Lahore Treaty did not remove the Sikh Government of the reduced territory or change its composition. The vizier Lal Singh and the majority of the members of the Lahore Durbar remained in office. Duleep Singh Bahadur, the seven-year-old son of Ranjit Singh, remained as Maharaja and his mother, Maharani Jind Kaur Sahiba, was to remain as regent. The Maharani had not committed Sati on Ranjit Singh's funeral pyre with his four principal wives, as she needed to look after the (then) 10-month-old Duleep. At the request of the Durbar the Treaty had specified that the British were to retain a force in Lahore until no longer than the end of the year "for the purpose of protecting the person of the Maharaja and the inhabitants of the City during the reorganisation of the Sikh army". However, when the time came for the British to leave, the Durbar pressed them to remain and on 16 December 1846 Currie assisted by Lawrence, by this time a lieutenant colonel, signed the Treaty of Bhyroval, under the terms of which the British consented to remain until the Maharaja reached the age of 16. A condition of the agreement was that the Regent should be replaced by a resident British officer. The Maharani was awarded a pension of 150,000 rupees and replaced by Lawrence as Resident, who "shall have full authority to direct and control all matters in every Department of the State". In the words of a contemporary "An officer of the company's artillery became, in effect, the successor of Ranjit Singh".

=== The Period as Resident at Lahore and the events leading to the Second Anglo-Sikh War ===
In 1847 Currie was appointed to the Supreme Council of India. However, he was soon to be appointed to a different post. Henry Lawrence was granted sick leave in 1848 and travelled back to England with Hardinge, who had come to the end of his term of office as Governor-General. Hardinge was replaced on 12 January by the Earl of Dalhousie, a former President of the Board of Trade in Sir Robert Peel's cabinet and, on 6 March, Currie replaced Lawrence as Resident at Lahore.

During the first few months of 1848 the Punjab had been disturbed by only a few incidents. Hardinge, when leaving, had predicted that peace in India would remain unbroken for the next seven years. The periodical The Friend of India reported "the last obstacle to the complete, and apparently the final, pacification of India has been removed". The London Morning Herald considered that "India is in the full enjoyment of a peace which, humanly speaking, there seems nothing to disturb".

It was the calm in the eye of the storm. Beneath the surface there was turmoil in both camps. Many of the Sikh commanders were seething at what they saw as the treachery of their general Tej Singh during the war and the subsequent settlement. Before he left, Lawrence had exiled Lal Singh, for urging Kashmir governor Shaikh Imamuddin not to turn over that country to Gulab Singh, and had replaced him as vizier by Tej Singh. When Maharaja Duleep Singh refused to invest Tej Singh as prime minister, Lawrence had imprisoned the Regent, Maharani Jind Kaur, and this treatment of the widow of Maharaja Ranjit Singh, was a further source of anger and unrest.

In the British camp, John Lawrence, who had been expected to receive the Resident appointment during his brother's leave of absence, was critical of Currie, pointing out that the latter lacked military knowledge and experience of the feuds and alliances of the numerous Sikh, Muslim and Hindu factions. Lawrence, who at that time was Commissioner of the Jullundur District (he later became Viceroy and Governor-General of India), was charismatic and independent, traits he shared with several other officers connected with the Lahore Residency, including Captain (later Brigadier-General) John Nicholson, Commissioner of the Sind Sagar District, Captain James Abbott (later General Sir James Abbott), Deputy Commissioner of Hazara and Lieutenant Herbert Edwardes of the 1st Bengal Fusiliers (later Major-General Sir Herbert Edwardes), Assistant at Bannu to the Resident. These would have been a challenging bunch to manage even if circumstances had given Currie time to settle into his new post before the situation exploded.

When the Diwan Mul Raj Multanwala, governor of the Sikh province of Multan, was faced with an increase in the levy imposed by the British, he resigned his office. To replace him, Currie appointed the Sikh Sardar Kahn Singh Man, who arrived at Multan on 18 April with two British officers, Mr Vans Agnew and Lieutenant William Anderson. The Diwan handed over the keys peacefully, but afterwards his soldiers attacked and wounded the British officers, who were rescued by Kahn Singh and his troops and carried to the British temporary camp at Idgah, half a mile from the fort of Multan. Agnew sent urgent messages to Lieutenant Edwardes and Colonel van Cortland, asking for help. However the following day a Mazhabi boy was shot by one of Kahn Singh's men and an angry mob from the city sought out and killed the British officers. Kahn Singh was taken prisoner and led before Mul Raj, who presented him with Vans Agnew's head and told him to take it back to Currie. Mul Raj then declared a holy war against the British and set about strengthening the defences of the citadel.

Lieutenant Edwardes quickly decided to quell what he saw as a local outbreak before it developed into a national revolt. With Currie's agreement he assembled a force with help from Cortland and the Khan of Bhawalpur, marched on Multan and called upon the rebels to surrender. When Dalhousie heard about this, he was furious that a subaltern should act in this way without his authority. He sharply reprimanded Currie for allowing Edwardes to march on Multan, and ordered him to "keep his reckless subaltern absolutely and utterly away from Multan". Currie wrote to Dalhousie defending Edwardes and asking for a free hand in dealing with the situation. He also wrote to Gough, the Commander-in-Chief, recommending that a British force should at once move upon Multan, capable of reducing the fort and occupying the city. Neither request was granted immediately. Gough, in his summer headquarters in the hill station at Simla, considered that military activity during the hot and monsoon seasons (May to September) was inadvisable. However, the Lahore garrison was reinforced, as were also the forces at Ambala and Firozpur.

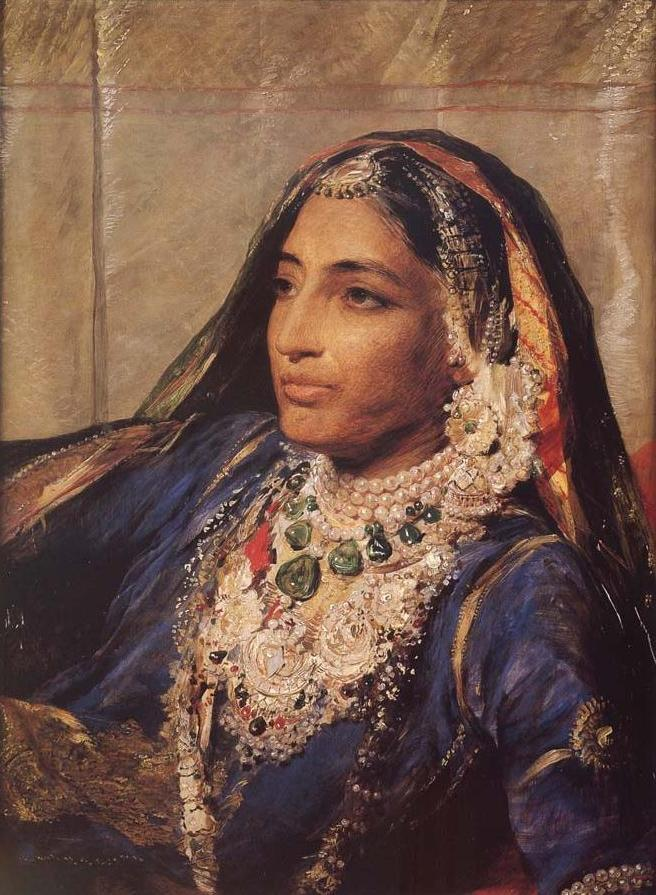
Maharani Jindan Kaur

Meanwhile, the imprisonment of Maharani Jindan Kaur in the Sheikhupura Fort in the Punjab had not destroyed her determination and ability to influence the affairs of the Punjab. She maintained contact with Sikh leaders and Currie described her as "the rallying point of rebellion". On discovering plots by her against the British, he decided to exile her from the Punjab. She was taken to the Chunar Fort, about 45 km from Varanesi, her allowance was reduced from 150,000 to 48,000 rupees and her jewellery and cash were taken from her. This caused deep resentment among Sikhs and fuelled the developing rebellion. The Muslim ruler of neighbouring Afghanistan, Dost Mohammad Khan protested that such treatment is objectionable to all creeds.

Trouble was also brewing in the Hazara province. During the first months of Currie's Residency Captain James Abbot had warned Currie that discontent was rife in the Sikh brigade stationed there and in August he reported that its Governor, Sardar Chattar Singh Attariwalla was planning an uprising against the British. Abbott raised a Muslim force and marched on the capital to expel Chatar Singh. Currie ordered an investigation by Captain John Nicholson, whose report excused the defensive measures the Governor had taken to protect the capital, but drew attention to Chatar Singh's numerous previous actions, which had given rise to and justified Abbott's assessment. Accordingly, Currie issued orders that substantially reduced Chatar Singh's authority and income. This angered his son, Raja Sher Singh Atarivala, who was fighting on the British side with Edwardes against Diwan Mul Raj. Sher Singh was a prominent member of the Council of the Regency and was until then well disposed to British interests. His sister was betrothed to Maharaja Duleep Singh and in November 1847 he had been honoured by the Lahore Durbar with the title Raja.

In July, Dalhousie granted Currie the free hand he had asked for in April. Currie ordered a force from the East India Company's Bengal Army, under General Whish, to join Edwardes and the contingents from Van Cortland, Bhawalpa and Sher Singh in the Siege of Multan. The forces under General Whish arrived outside Multan between 18 and 28 August. However, Sher Singh and his troops changed sides on 13 September, angered by the treatment of both his father and sister, and the Bhawalpa troops and a number of Edwardes' irregulars dispersed to their homes in sympathy with them, severely weakening the British side. The fortified city of Multan with its fortress citadel was considered to be the strongest in the Punjab and General Whish decided that the siege must be abandoned until the arrival of reinforcements from Bengal, so he withdrew to a position which commanded the principal roads to Bahawalpur and the Derajat. The reinforcements started arriving in November and heavy siege guns arrived at the beginning of December. Their batteries made two breaches in the city walls and on 30 August destroyed the main magazine in the citadel. The city itself fell early in January 1849, but the citadel held out for two more weeks, finally falling on 18 January.

Sher Singh had offered to assist Mul Raj, who declined his offer but gave him money to pay his army, so he moved northward with his troops at the end of September on the way to join his father. He proclaimed himself a servant of the Maharajah and the Khalsa and called upon the people of the Punjab to rise in arms and expel the British. Meanwhile, the Sikh contingents at Bannu, Kohat, Tofik, Peshawar and Attock had joined Chatar Singh.

The monsoon over, Gough announced in early October the formation of "the Army of the Punjab" to operate under his personal control. He reached Lahore on 13 November. Full accounts of the campaign are given elsewhere. Summarising:

- 22 November - Gough's cavalry fell into a trap at the ford of the Chenab River at Ramnager, with severe losses, including the deaths of General Cureton and Colonel Havelock;
- 13 January - a disastrous battle at Chillianwala, after which Lord Airey, referring to the infamous Charge of the Light Brigade at Balaklava, said "It is nothing to Chillianwala";
- 25 January - Sher Singh, joined by Chatar Singh's army, moved to Gujrat, on the Chenab River;
- 18 February - General Whish's troops and heavy batteries arrived from Multan and during the next two days brigades from Bombay and Bengal arrived;
- 21 February - the British won a decisive final victory in the Battle of Gujrat;
- 14 March - Sher Singh surrendered to the British at Rawalpindi;
- 29 March - the British flag was hoisted on the citadel of Lahore and the Punjab was formally proclaimed to be part of the British Empire.

Currie had called for military help to protect the young Maharaja and his government of the Lahore Durbar. However, despite his protests and strong opposition from Henry Lawrence, who by that time had returned from leave, Dalhousie had annulled the Lahore Government, exiled Duleep Singh and confiscated the Koh-i-Noor diamond, the symbol of his power. The Sikh Raj was ended. The annexation of the Punjab was complete. A Sikh warrior cried out "Aj Ranjit Singh mar gaya" - Today Ranjit Singh is dead.

=== Later career and return to England ===
On 12 March 1849, Currie again took up his office as a member of the Supreme Council of India. He returned to England in 1853 and the following year he was elected a director of the East India Company. In 1857 he was elected chairman of the company, the last person to hold that office, and advised the British government on the transfer of power from the company to the Crown.

A letter, dated 23 June 1858, from Currie and his vice-chairman to Lord Stanley, President of the Board of Control, expressed reservations regarding several of the clauses of a Bill before Parliament for the better Government of India. The proposed Government of India Act 1858 created a new cabinet post of Secretary of State for India with sweeping powers, advised, if and when the Secretary wished, by a newly created Council of India. The reservations expressed in the letter related to the method of composition of the council, its constitution and its powers. The Act was passed by the British Parliament on 2 August 1858 and Currie was appointed vice-president of the new Council, a post which he held until his death.

== Family ==
Currie married three times. His first wife was Susannah, daughter of John Pascal Larkins of the Bengal Civil Service. They married on 7 August 1820 and had four children: Frederick, Mark Edward, William Close and Charles.

After Susannah's death in 1832 he married Lucy Elizabeth, daughter of Robert Merttins Bird of the Bengal Civil Service, on 3 September 1834. They had one son, Robert George; Lucy died three weeks later, on 25 July 1835.

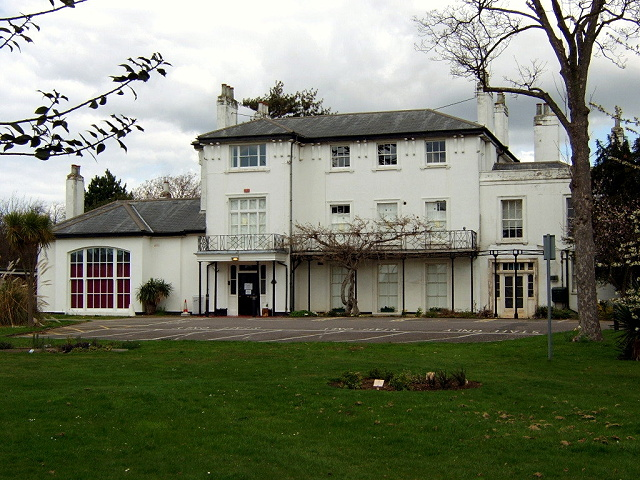
Crayford Manor House

His third wife was Katherine Maria, daughter of George Powney Thompson, also of the Bengal Civil Service. They had seven children: Fendall, who played first-class cricket for the Gentlemen of Kent and became a Major-General, Harriet Sophia, Susan Mary, Katherine Louisa, Mabel Thornton, Hugh Penton and Rivers Grenfell. The 1861 and 1871 British Census returns show him living at the Manor House, May Place, Crayford, Kent, England with his third wife Katharine Maria and the first six of his seven children by that marriage.

He was made an honorary Doctor of Civil Law by the University of Oxford in 1866. He died at St Leonards, Sussex, England, on 11 September 1875, aged 76. Katharine Maria survived him, dying on 30 January 1909, aged 87.

He was succeeded by his eldest son, Reverend Sir Frederick Larkins Currie, 2nd Bt.

== See also ==
- Currie baronets

Baronetage of the United Kingdom
New creation	Baronet (of Wickham Bishops); 1847–1875	Succeeded by Frederick Larkins Currie
