= Fendall Currie =

English cricketer and Royal Marines officer

- Born: 24 November 1841; Allahabad, North-Western Provinces, British India
- Died: 4 December 1920 (aged 79); Dorking, Surrey, England
- Military career
- Allegiance: United Kingdom; British India
- Branch: Bengal Cavalry
- Service years: 1858–1898
- Rank: Major-general

Major-General Fendall Currie (24 November 1841 – 4 December 1920) was an English first-class cricketer, barrister and British Indian Army officer. He served in the Bengal Cavalry from 1858–1898, rising to the rank of major-general, in addition being a barrister and a judge while in British India. Currie was also a first-class cricketer, playing once in England for the Gentlemen of Kent.

== Life, military and legal career ==
The son of Sir Frederick Currie, he was born in British India at Allahabad in November 1841. Following the Indian Rebellion of 1857, men were hastily recruited in Britain to replace the eight regiments of Bengal Light Cavalry which had mutinied, with Currie enlisting as a cornet in the 1st European Light Cavalry and arriving in India in December 1858. He returned to England on leave in 1861, during which he made a single appearance in first-class cricket for the Gentlemen of Kent against the Gentlemen of Marylebone Cricket Club at Canterbury. Batting twice in the match, he was dismissed without scoring in the Gentlemen of Kent first innings by Henry Arkwright, while in their second innings he batted at number eleven, scoring a single unbeaten run. Currie bowled 23 overs across the match, taking 6 wickets.

Returning to India, Currie was appointed a deputy commissioner at Hazaribagh in February 1863, before serving in the Oudh commission in September of the same year. He became a lieutenant in March 1864, antedated to March 1859. He was appointed as a judge at the small cause court at Sitapur in June 1868, and in November of the same year he was appointed junior secretary to the chief commissioner there. He was promoted to captain in September 1870, at which point he was still serving with the 1st European Light Cavalry, in addition to being a city magistrate at Lucknow. Currie had studied law and was called to the bar as a member of Lincoln's Inn in January 1874. He was appointed a deputy commissioner at Lucknow in November 1878, while in November of the following year he was promoted to brevet major. He gained the full rank of major in January 1883, while in March 1888 he was appointed a commissioner at Lucknow.

By 1898 Currie held the rank of colonel. In June 1898, he was promoted to major-general. He later returned to England, where he settled at Dorking. Currie wrote a number of legal commentaries and manuals, including the Indian Code of Criminal Procedure and the Indian Law Examination Manual. He was married twice, firstly to Susan Elizabeth Pears until her death in 1868, with the couple having two children, and secondly to Julia Buller, whom he had married in 1869 and had seven children with. Currie died at Dorking in December 1920. Amongst his immediate family, his half-brothers Frederick and William and Robert also played first-class cricket. Several nephews were prominent first-class cricketers in county cricket.
