= Sir Frederick Currie, 2nd Baronet =

English cricketer and baronet

Frederick Currie
Cricket information
- Batting: Right handed

Career statistics
Competition	First-class
Matches	6
Runs scored	60
Batting average	5.45
100s/50s	0/0
Top score	13
Catches/stumpings	7/0
- Source: CricInfo, 19 August 2019

The Reverend Sir Frederick Larkins Currie, 2nd Baronet (18 April 1823 in Gorakhpur, Uttar Pradesh – 13 November 1900) was an English baronet, the eldest child of Sir Frederick Currie, 1st Baronet and Susannah née Larkins.

He was educated at Rugby and Christ's College, Cambridge, where he played first-class cricket for the university. He became an Anglican clergyman, holding incumbencies at Exton and St Andrew's Wells Street, W.1

== Family ==
He married Eliza Reeve Rackham on 18 September 1849. They had seven children: Eliza Kate, Susannah Louisa, Frederick Reeve, Walter Louis Rackham, Percy George Colin, Arthur Edward and Cecil Edmund, who played cricket for Cambridge University and Hampshire. After his first wife's death, he married Mary Helen Corrie on 24 April 1866. There were no children by the second marriage.

On his death the title passed to his son, Frederick Reeve Currie. and, after Frederick Reeve's death, to his next son Walter Louis Rackham Currie.

Baronetage of the United Kingdom
Preceded by Frederick Currie	Baronet (of Wickham Bishops); 1875–1900	Succeeded by Frederick Reeve Currie
