= Currie (surname) =

- Gender: Unisex
- Language: English

Origin
- Languages: 1–3. Scottish English; 4. Scottish Gaelic; 5. English; 6. Old French
- Origin: 1. Currie, Midlothian; 2. Corrie, Dumfriesshire; 3. Curry; 4. MacMhuirich; 5. Curry, Somerset; 6. curie 7. Currie, King Island (Tasmania)

Other names
- See also: Curry

Currie is a surname in the English language. The name has numerous origins.

== Etymology ==
In some cases it originated as a habitational name, derived from Currie in Midlothian, Scotland. In other cases it originated as a habitational name, derived from Corrie, in Dumfriesshire, Scotland. A third origin for the surname is that it originated as a Scottish spelling of the Irish surname Curry, a surname which has several origins. A fourth origin of the surname, particularly on Arran, is as an Anglicised form of the Scottish Gaelic MacMhuirich. The Hebridean MacMhuirich evolved in such a way that the forms McVurich and McCurrie first appeared in the 17th century, and by the 18th century Currie is found on Islay, and on Uist by the 19th century. Another origin of the surname is from Curry, in Somerset, England. In some cases the name may also be derived from the Old French curie, which means "kitchen".

Early forms of the surname include: æt Curi, in about 1075; and de Cury, in 1212. Both forms are derived from the place name in Somerset. Other early forms include: atte Curie, in SRS 1327; and atte Corye. Early forms of the surname, derived from a Scottish place name, is de Curry, in 1179; and de Curri, in 1210. An early form of the surname, when derived from MacMhuirich is M'Currie and Currie, in the early 18th century.

It can be a sept of Clan Donald or Clan Macpherson.

== Persons with the surname ==
- Airese Currie (born 1982), American football player
- Alannah Currie (born 1957), New Zealand musician
- Alex Currie (1891–1951), Canadian hockey player and coach
- Archibald Currie (disambiguation)
- Arthur Currie (1875–1933), Canadian general
- Austin Currie (1939–2021), Irish politician
- Balfour Currie (1902–1981), Canadian scientist
- Barbara Flynn Currie (1940–2026), American politician
- Betty Currie (born 1939), secretary to Bill Clinton
- Bill Currie (baseball) (1928–2013), American baseball player
- Bill Currie (footballer) (born 1940s), Scottish footballer
- Billy Currie (born 1950), British musician
- Blair Currie (born 1994), Scottish footballer
- Bob Currie (1918–1988), British motorcycle journalist
- Bob Currie (footballer), Scottish footballer
- Cameron McGowan Currie (born 1948), US federal judge
- Cecil Currie (1861–1937), English cricketer
- Cherie Currie (born 1959), American rock singer
- Colin Currie, Scottish percussionist
- Dan Currie (1935–2017), American football player
- Dan Currie (footballer) (1935–1992), Scottish footballer
- Darren Currie (born 1974), English footballer
- David Currie (disambiguation)
- David Vivian Currie (1912–1986), Canadian Army officer
- Dennis Hadley Currie (1874–1928), American brigadier general
- Don Currie (born 1934), New Zealand cricketer
- Donald Currie (1825–1909), Scottish shipowner, politician and philanthropist
- Donald Currie (field hockey) (born 1935), Australian field hockey player
- Duncan Currie (1892–1916), Scottish footballer
- Edwina Currie (born 1946), British politician
- Finlay Currie (1878–1968), Scottish actor
- Sir Frederick Currie, 1st Baronet (1799–1875), member of the Supreme Council of India
- Sir Frederick Currie, 2nd Baronet (1823–1900), English cricketer
- George Currie (disambiguation)
- Gilbert A. Currie (1882–1960), American politician
- Gordon Gray Currie (1923–2017), Canadian politician
- Gordon Currie (actor), Canadian actor
- Gordon Currie (bobsleigh) (born 1933), Canadian bobsledder
- Gregory Currie, Australian philosopher
- Herschel Currie (born 1965), American football player
- James Currie (disambiguation)
- John Currie (disambiguation)
- Justin Currie (born 1964), Scottish singer-songwriter
- Katie Cabell Currie (1861–1927), American socialite and clubwoman
- Ken Currie (born 1960), Scottish artist
- Lauchlin Currie (1902–1993), Canadian economist
- Louise Currie (1913–2013), American actress
- Marie Currie (born 1959), American rock singer
- Mark Currie (games developer)
- Mark John Currie (1795–1874), English explorer, Royal Navy vice-admiral and founder settler in Western Australia
- Martin William Currie (born 1943), Canadian Catholic retired archbishop and bishop
- Michael Currie (actor) (1928–2009), American actor
- Michael Currie (politician) (born 1955), Canadian politician
- Michael Currie (footballer) (born 1979), English footballer
- Monique Currie (born 1983), American basketball player
- Nancy J. Currie (born 1958), American astronaut
- Philip Currie, 1st Baron Currie (1834–1906), British diplomat
- Philip J. Currie (born 1949), Canadian paleontologist
- Raikes Currie (1801–1881), English politician
- Richard Currie (born 1937), Canadian businessman
- Robert Currie (disambiguation)
- Sondra Currie (born 1947), American actress
- Steve Currie (1947–1981), bassist for T. Rex
- Tony Currie (disambiguation)
- Troy Currie, American teacher and sex offender
- Ulysses Currie (1937–2019), American politician
- William Currie (disambiguation)
