= Macpherson =

MacPherson or Macpherson is a surname, meaning "son of the parson" in Scottish Gaelic. Notable people with the surname include:

== In sports ==
- Archie Macpherson (born 1937), Scottish football commentator
- Bruce MacPherson (field hockey), Canadian field hockey player
- Bryden Macpherson, Australian amateur golfer
- Duncan MacPherson, ice hockey player
- Gus MacPherson, Scottish footballer
- Jeff MacPherson (born 1956), American driver in the CART Championship Car series
- Michelle MacPherson, Canadian swimmer

== In politics ==
- Ben Macpherson (politician), Scottish politician
- C. B. Macpherson, Canadian academic
- Dean Macpherson, South African politician
- Hector Macpherson, Sr. (1875–1970), Canadian-American agricultural economics professor and politician
- Hector Macpherson, Jr. (1918–2015), American farmer and politician
- James Ian Macpherson, British lawyer and politician
- John Alexander MacPherson, Australian politician
- John MacPherson (governor of India), Scottish administrator in India
- John Thomas Macpherson (1872–1921), English politician
- Malcolm MacPherson (1904–1971), Scottish politician
- Murdoch MacPherson, Canadian politician
- Niall Macpherson, 1st Baron Drumalbyn, Scottish politician
- Nicholas Macpherson, British civil servant
- Peter MacPherson (1841–1913), Scottish-born Australian politician
- Thomas Macpherson, 1st Baron Macpherson of Drumochter (1888–1965), Scottish politician

== In music ==
- Ben Macpherson, Australian musician
- Christina Macpherson, Australian behind Waltzing Matilda
- Donald Macpherson (piper), Scottish bagpipe player
- Fraser MacPherson, Canadian jazz musician
- Gillie Mc Pherson, Northern Irish singer
- Graham MacPherson, better known as Suggs (singer), the lead singer of the English band Madness
- Greg MacPherson, Canadian singer-songwriter
- Jim Macpherson, United States percussionist
- Linda Lizotte-MacPherson, Canadian public servant
- Sandy MacPherson, Canadian theatre organist

== In literature ==
- James Alan McPherson, American essayist
- James Macpherson, Scottish poet
- Jay Macpherson, Canadian poet

== In show business and news ==
- Daniel MacPherson (born 1980), Australian actor and television presenter
- Don Macpherson (born 1954), Canadian journalist
- Duncan Macpherson (1924–1993), Canadian editorial cartoonist
- Elle Macpherson (born 1964), Australian supermodel and actress
- Gordon Macpherson (born 1962), Founder of Macpherson Menswear – Palmerston North, New Zealand
- Hector Macpherson (1851–1924), Scottish journalist and writer
- Jeanie MacPherson (1886–1946), American silent actress, writer and director
- Malcolm MacPherson (1943–2009), American journalist and author
- Myra MacPherson (1934–2026), American journalist and author
- Richard MacPherson, American actor

== In military ==
- Lieutenant Ralph Stewart MacPherson (1896–1964), Canadian Army officer
- Colonel Ronald MacPherson or Ranald MacPherson (1817–1869), architect and colonial administrator
- Colonel Tommy Macpherson, British army officer
- Sir Keith Macpherson Smith, (1890–1955) Australian aviator
- Sir Ross Macpherson Smith, KBE, MC & Bar, DFC & Two Bars, AFC (1892–1922) Australian aviator
- Henry Douglas Macpherson (1898–1917) British, WW1 fighter pilot
- Donald McPherson (1922–2025), American WW2 fighter pilot ace.

== Others ==
- Alexander Macpherson, English architect
- Cluny MacPherson, Newfoundland medical doctor and inventor of the gas mask
- Colin MacPherson, Scottish Roman Catholic Bishop of Argyll and the Isles from 1968 to 1990
- Donald Macpherson (disambiguation), several people
- Earle S. MacPherson, the Ford engineer who developed the MacPherson strut in the 1940s
- Ewen MacPherson of Cluny, Scottish Jacobite
- Fiona Macpherson, FRSE, MAE, Scottish Professor of Philosophy and Director of the Centre for the Study of Perceptual Experience, University of Glasgow
- Hector Macpherson (astronomer) (1888–1956), Scottish clergyman and astronomer, son of Hector C. Macpherson
- Ian MacPherson, Canadian historian
- Jamie Macpherson, Scottish outlaw, famed for his lament
- John Macferson, early 18th-century English pirate
- Sir Macpherson Robertson, Australian philanthropist and entrepreneur
- Robert Macpherson (disambiguation), multiple people
- Sir William Macpherson, High Court Judge in England

== Fictional characters ==
- Anya MacPherson, fictional character in Degrassi: The Next Generation

== See also ==
- Clan Macpherson, a Scottish clan
- The Macpherson Report, into the death of Black British teenage Stephen Lawrence
- MacPherson v. Buick Motor Co.
- MacPherson strut, a car suspension system
- MacPherson, Singapore
- Macpherson Stadium (disambiguation)
- McPherson (disambiguation)
