= Swimming at the 2013 Canada Summer Games =

Swimming at the 2013 Canada Summer Games was in Sherbrooke, Quebec at the Universite de Sherbrooke for diving and swimming. It was held from the 4 to 17 August. There were 70 events of swimming.

== Medal table ==
The following is the medal table for swimming at the 2013 Canada Summer Games.

* Host nation ( Quebec)

Rank	Nation	Gold	Silver	Bronze	Total
1	Ontario	32	17	15	64
2	Alberta	13	25	14	52
3	British Columbia	11	5	13	29
4	Quebec*	10	14	15	39
5	Saskatchewan	2	3	0	5
6	Manitoba	1	3	6	10
7	Nova Scotia	1	2	7	10
8	Newfoundland and Labrador	0	1	0	1
Totals (8 entries)		70	70	70	210

The following medal table provides a statistical analysis by subtracting, focusing, and combining paralympic and Special Olympic events from the total medals counted. This table sorts by total medals minus PSO.

Key

PSO = Paralympic and Special Olympic

Province	Minus PSO				PSO				Combined			
Province	Gold	Silver	Bronze	Total	Gold	Silver	Bronze	Total	Gold	Silver	Bronze	Total
Ontario	25	15	11	51	7	2	4	13	32	17	15	64
Alberta	7	16	9	32	6	9	5	20	13	25	14	52
Quebec	7	9	11	27	3	5	4	12	10	14	15	39
British Columbia	6	3	9	18	5	2	4	11	11	5	13	29
Manitoba	1	2	5	8	0	1	1	2	1	3	6	10
Newfoundland and Labrador	0	1	0	1	0	0	0	0	0	1	0	1
Nova Scotia	0	0	2	2	1	2	5	8	1	2	7	10
Saskatchewan	0	0	0	0	2	3	0	5	2	3	0	5
TOTAL												

== Results ==
=== Men's ===
Event	Gold		Silver		Bronze	
50 m Freestyle	Yuri Kisil; Alberta	23.37	Sergey Holson; British Columbia	23.38	Mirando Jarry; Quebec	23.58
100 m Freestyle	Yuri Kisil; Alberta	51.47	Anthony Lyons; Alberta	51.56	Mitchel Ferraro; Ontario	51.58
200 m Freestyle	Jonathan Brown; Alberta	1:51.52	Teddy Kalp; Ontario	1:52.44	Stefan Milosevic; British Columbia	1:52.49
400 m Freestyle	Teddy Kalp; Ontario	3:57.54	Jonathan Brown; Alberta	3:59.29	Tristan Cote; Ontario	3:59.80
800 m Freestyle	Teddy Kalp; Ontario	8:11.77	Jonathan Brown; Alberta	8:12.51	Jon McKay; British Columbia	8:14.49
1,500 m Freestyle	Jon Mckay; British Columbia	15:40.35	Teddy Kalp; Ontario	15:49.28	Jonathan Brown; Alberta	15:52.39
5,000 m Open water	Liam Desjarlais; Quebec	59:11.35	Nicolas Masse-Savard; Quebec	59:11.77	Jon McKay; British Columbia	59:13.40
50 m Breaststroke	Sergey Holson; British Columbia	28.95	Antoine Bujold; Quebec	29.20	Eli Wall; Ontario	29.30
100 m Breaststroke	Antoine Bujold; Quebec	1:03.24	Eli Wall; Ontario	1:04.25	James Guest; Quebec	1:04.29
200 m Breaststroke	Evan White; Ontario	2:17.70	Antoine Bujold; Quebec	2:17.72	James Guest; Quebec	2:18.89
50 m Butterfly	Edward Liu; Ontario	24.91	Owen Daly; Newfoundland and Labrador	25.09	Samuel Wang; Quebec	25.24
100 m Butterfly	Evan White; Ontario	54.53	Edward Liu; Ontario	54.79	Mohamed Eldah; Nova Scotia	55.32
200 m Butterfly	Evan White; Ontario	2:01.99	Gamal Assaad; Ontario	2:03.56	Stefan Milosevic; British Columbia	2:03.63
50 m Backstroke	Jeff Swanston; Ontario	26.13	Joe Byram; Alberta	26.13	Sean Berrigan; Nova Scotia	27.17
100 m Backstroke	Jeff Swanston; Ontario	55.88	Joe Byram; Alberta	56.10	Markus Thormeyer; British Columbia	56.64
200 m Backstroke	Joe Byram; Alberta	2:02.07	Jeff Swanston; Ontario	2:02.07	Yuri Kisil; Alberta	2:03.80
200 m Medley	Evan White; Ontario	2:04.02	Jonathan Brown; Alberta	2:05.95	Austin Smith; Ontario	2:06.19
400 m Medley	Luke Reilly; British Columbia	4:24.26	Tristan Cote; Ontario	4:25.81	Joseph Wright; Saskatchewan	4:25.96
4 x 50 m Freestyle relay	Ontario; Mitchell Ferraro; Edward Liu; Oliver Straszynski; Bryce Kwiecien-Delaney	1:33.55	Alberta	1:33.96	Quebec	1:34.90
4 x 100 m Freestyle relay	Ontario	3:24.34	Alberta	3:25.12	British Columbia	3:25.59
4 x 200 m Freestyle relay	Ontario	7:28.28	Alberta	7:30.68	British Columbia	7:34.36
4 x 50 m Medley relay	Alberta	1:42.95	Ontario	1:43.71	Quebec	1:43.78
4 x 100 m Medley relay	Ontario	3:45.45	Alberta	3:46.85	Quebec	3:47.73

=== Para and Special Olympics ===
Event	Gold		Silver		Bronze	
50 m Freestyle Para	Dalton Boon; British Columbia	26.94	Stefan Daniel; Alberta	28.37	Thomas Swinkels; Nova Scotia	28.43
100 m Freestyle Para	Dalton Boon; British Columbia	59.29	Alec Elliot; Ontario	58.00	Stefan Daniel; Alberta	1:02.37
100 m Freestyle Special Olympics	Elliott Moskowy; Alberta	1:04.30	Tim Ferris; Nova Scotia	1:07.19	Andrew Perez; Quebec	1:07.95
200 m (S1-5) / 400m (S6-13) Freestyle Para	Alec Elliot; Ontario	4:26.91	Dalton Boon; British Columbia	2:09.18	Zach Zona; Ontario	5:14.26
50 m Freestyle Special Olympics	Elliott Moskowy; Alberta	29.14	Tim Ferris; Nova Scotia	29.83	Magnus Batara; British Columbia	30.03
50 m Backstroke Special Olympics	Magnus Batara; British Columbia	35.73	Elliott Moskowy; Alberta	36.37	Tim Ferris; Nova Scotia	37.03
100 m Backstroke Special Olympics	Magnus Batara; British Columbia	1:17.49	Elliott Moskowy; Alberta	1:19.86	Tim Ferris; Nova Scotia	1:20.68
50 m (S1-3) / 100m (S4-14) Breaststroke Para	Thomas Swinkels; Nova Scotia	1:20.51	Dalton Boon; British Columbia	1:23.86	Tyler Mrak; British Columbia	1:25.54
50 m (S1-5) / 100m (S6-14) Backstroke Para	Alec Elliot; Ontario	1:04.94	Phillipe Vachon; Quebec	1:11.67	Dalton Boon; British Columbia	1:12.83
50 m (S1-7) / 100m (S8-14) Butterfly Para	Alec Elliot; Ontario	59.34	Stefan Daniel; Alberta	1:14.58	Zach Zona; Ontario	1:17.74
50 m Breaststroke Special Olympics	Magnus Batara; British Columbia	36.80	Elliott Moskowy; Alberta	39.16	Tim Ferris; Nova Scotia	41.31
150 m (S1-4) / 200m (S5-14) Medley Para	Alec Elliot; Ontario	2:21.89	Thomas Swinkels; Nova Scotia	2:42.16	Stefan Daniel; Alberta	2:42.38

=== Women's ===
Event	Gold		Silver		Bronze	
50 m Freestyle	Victoria Chan; Ontario	25.75	Paige Kremer; Alberta	26.43	Ariane Mainville; Quebec	26.51
100 m Freestyle	Victoria Chan; Ontario	56.05	Paige Kremer; Alberta	56.39	Kennedy Goss; Ontario	56.53
200 m Freestyle	Kennedy Goss; Ontario	2:02.01	Emily Overholt; British Columbia	2:02.04	Victoria Chan; Ontario	2:03.70
400 m Freestyle	Emily Overholt; British Columbia	4:15.75	Caitlin Hodge; Quebec	4:17.17	Karyl Clarete; Manitoba	4:19.59
800 m Freestyle	Sophia Saroukian; Alberta	8:51.90	Danica Ludlow; British Columbia	8:57.32	Breanne Siwicki; Manitoba	9:01.87
1,500 m Freestyle	Breanne Siwicki; Manitoba	17:03.68	Caitlin Hodge; Quebec	17:13.90	Sophia Saroukian; Alberta	17:18.74
5,000 m Open water	Caitlin Hodge; Quebec	1:02:52.37	Jade Dusablon; Quebec	1:02:52.65	Breanne Siwicki; Manitoba	1:02:57.71
50 m Breaststroke	Marie-Laurence Godin; Quebec	32.47	Erin Stamp; Ontario	32.69	Genevieve Robertson; Ontario	33.13
100 m Breaststroke	Erin Stamp; Ontario	1:11.40	Marie-Laurence Godin; Quebec	1:11.52	Genevieve Robertson; Ontario	1:11.52
200 m Breaststroke	Erin Stamp; Ontario	2:33.43	Genevieve Robertson; Ontario	2:34.16	Kelsey Wog; Manitoba	2:34.56
50 m Butterfly	Frédérique Cigna; Quebec	27.59	Lili Margitai; Alberta	27.66	Kylie Masse; Ontario	27.77
100 m Butterfly	Devon Bibault; Alberta	1:01.51	Lili Margitai; Alberta	1:01.79	Frédérique Cigna; Quebec	1:02.10
200 m Butterfly	Sophie Marois; Quebec	2:16.03	Breanne Siwicki; Manitoba	2:16.18	Jacomie Strydom; Alberta	2:16.35
50 m Backstroke	Danielle Hanus; Ontario	28.94	Ingrid Wilm; Alberta	29.50	Kennedy Goss; Ontario	29.87
100 m Backstroke	Kennedy Goss; Ontario	1:02:30	Danielle Hanus; Ontario	1:02:75	Meryn McCann; Ontario	1:03:89
200 m Backstroke	Meryn McCann; Ontario	2:14.33	Danielle Hanus; Ontario	2:15.39	Breanne Siwicki; Manitoba	2:17.16
200 m Medley	Emily Overholt; British Columbia	2:17.66	Samantha Stratford; Ontario	2:18.84	Lili Margitai; Alberta	2:20.84
400 m Medley	Emily Overholt; British Columbia	4:47.08	Breanne Siwicki; Manitoba	4:48.43	Mary-Sophie Harvey; Quebec	4:55:58
4 x 50 m Freestyle relay	Ontario; Victoria Chan; Sharalynn Missiuna; Kylie Masse; Kennedy Goss	1:44.70	Alberta	1:45.49	Quebec	1:45.78
4 x 100 m Freestyle relay	Ontario	3:49.23	Alberta	3:49.38	Quebec	3:50.07
4 x 200 m Freestyle relay	Ontario	8:14.35	Alberta	8:20.19	Quebec	8:23.22
4 x 50 m Medley relay	Ontario	1:54.16	Quebec	1:56.17	Alberta	1:57.49
4 x 100 m Medley relay	Ontario	4:10.27	Quebec	4:13.89	Alberta	4:14.37

=== Para and Special Olympics ===
Event	Gold		Silver		Bronze	
50 m Freestyle Para	Sam Ryan; Saskatchewan	34.96	Élodie Tremblay; Quebec	35.91	Avery Newton; British Columbia	36.12
100 m Freestyle Special Olympics	Miori Hénault; Quebec	1:15.05	Sydneysarah Chilwell; Ontario	1:20.96	Celine Schmidt; Alberta	1:22.17
200 m (S1-5) / 400m (S6-13) Freestyle Para	Alicia Denoon; Ontario	5:22.72	Sam Ryan; Saskatchewan	5:27.92	Kennedy Pasay; Alberta	5:45.70
50 m Freestyle Special Olympics	Miori Hénault; Quebec	34.46	Sydneysarah Chilwell; Ontario	35.60	Celine Schmidt; Alberta	35.93
50 m Backstroke Special Olympics	April Lam; Alberta	44.40	Miori Hénault; Quebec	44.70	Celine Schmidt; Alberta	45.06
100 m Backstroke Special Olympics	Miori Hénault; Quebec	1:35.25	Sam Currie; Manitoba	1:36.31	Celine Schmidt; Alberta	1:37.96
50 m (S1-3) / 100m (S4-14) Breaststroke Para	Hannah Smith; Alberta	1:34.60	Kennedy Pasay; Alberta	1:36.54	Alicia Denoon; Ontario	1:39.99
50 m (S1-5) / 100m (S6-14) Backstroke Para	Alicia Denoon; Ontario	1:20.96	Sam Ryan; Saskatchewan	1:24.68	Stéphanie Ducas; Quebec	1:28.94
50 m (S1-7) / 100m (S8-14) Butterfly Para	Sam Ryan; Saskatchewan	1:19.22	Kennedy Pasay; Alberta	1:28.76	Claire McNally; Nova Scotia	55.03
50 m Breaststroke Special Olympics	Cassidy Tran; Ontario	51.36	Amélie Plouffe; Quebec	51.70	Sam Currie; Manitoba	51.79
150 m (S1-4) / 200m (S5-14) Medley Para	Kennedy Pasay; Alberta	3:08.08	Élodie Tremblay; Quebec	3:34.60	Malina Nazaryan; Nova Scotia	4:22.01
200 m (S1-4) / 400m (S6-13) Medley Para	Alicia Denoon; Ontario	5:22.72	Sam Ryan; Saskatchewan	5:27.92	Kennedy Pasay; Alberta	5:45.70
