= Kaj Hasselriis =

Canadian politician and journalist

Personal details
- Born: January 4, 1974 (age 52) Winnipeg, Manitoba, Canada
- Education: University of Manitoba, Ryerson Polytechnic University

Kaj Hasselriis (born January 4, 1974) is a Canadian journalist, community activist and politician.

Hasselriis was born in Winnipeg, Manitoba, and is a lifelong Winnipegger. He earned a sociology degree from the University of Manitoba in 1995 as well as a journalism degree from Toronto's Ryerson Polytechnic University in 1997. From 1997 to 2002, Hasselriis worked as a reporter and producer for CBC Television. Most recently, Hasselriis created an English-language monthly in Lima, Peru called Limazine.

As a political organizer, Hasselriis served as the Manitoba campaign manager for Jack Layton's leadership bid in 2002. He also played a key role as a member of Toronto mayor David Miller's 2003 campaign team.

In 2004, Hasselriis gained prominence in Winnipeg by leading the fight to keep Winnipeg's bus rapid transit system. The city eventually cancelled the program, to the dismay of public transit activists.

On July 17, 2006, Hasselriis declared his candidacy in the October 2006 municipal elections against Winnipeg mayor Sam Katz. His campaign was endorsed by several prominent figures in the city, including musician John K. Samson and activist James Beddome.

On election day, October 25, 2006, Hasselriis received 22,401 votes, or 13.22 of the total count. He placed third to Katz, who was re-elected, and Marianne Cerilli, a former NDP MLA in the Manitoba Legislature.

Hasselriis, who is openly gay, was the national spokesperson for Canadians for Equal Marriage in 2006. He was appointed interim executive director of Egale Canada in January 2007, following the resignation of Gilles Marchildon, and served in that capacity until he was succeeded by Helen Kennedy in the fall.

He currently contributed to the Xtra! chain of LGBT newspapers as a Winnipeg-area reporter. He also wrote a series of travel essays on gay life in India while travelling in that country over the winter of 2008–2009 for both Xtra! and its gay travel magazine The Guide. As well, he was an occasional contributor to CBC Radio, including Definitely Not the Opera.

== Electoral record ==
2006 Winnipeg municipal election: Mayor of Winnipeg
Candidate	Votes	%
(x)Sam Katz	104,380	61.60
Marianne Cerilli	38,227	22.56
Kaj Hasselriis	22,401	13.22
Ron Pollock	4,444	2.62
Total valid votes	169,452	100.00
