= William Curry =

William Curry or Currie may refer to:

== Politics ==
- William Currie (British politician) (1756–1829), British MP for Gatton, 1790, and Winchelsea, 1796
- William Curry (MP) (1784–1843), Irish MP for Armagh City
- William Currie (Canadian politician) (1862–1934), manufacturer and political figure in New Brunswick, Canada
- Bill Curry (politician) (born 1951), American politician, Comptroller of the State of Connecticut, 1990–1994

== Sports ==
- Bill Currie (baseball) (1928–2013), American baseball player
- Bill Curry (English footballer) (1935–1990), English football forward active in the 1950s and 1960s
- Bill Currie (footballer) (born 1940s), Scottish footballer
- Bill Curry (born 1942), American college football coach

== Other ==
- William D. Curry (1926–2013), United States Air Force officer
- William Curry (designer) also credited as Bill Curry (1927–1971), American designer
- William Curry (oceanographer), American oceanographer
- Billy Currie (born 1950), British musician and songwriter, keyboard player with Ultravox
- William Curry, a character in the U.S. TV series Last Resort
- William J. Curry (1821–1896), Key West wrecking tycoon and Florida's first millionaire
- William Henry Curry, American conductor

== See also ==
- William Curry Holden (1896–1993), historian and archaeologist
