= Hector Macpherson =

Hector Macpherson may refer to:

- Hector Macpherson Sr. (1875–1970), Canadian-American agricultural economics professor and politician
- Hector Macpherson Jr. (1918–2015), American dairy farmer and politician in Oregon, son of Hector Macpherson Sr.
- Hector C. Macpherson (1851–1924), Scottish journalist, historian, and writer
- Hector Macpherson (astronomer) (1888–1956), Scottish clergyman and astronomer, son of Hector C. Macpherson
