= Robert Curry =

Robert Curry may also refer to:

- Robert Curry (wrestler) (1882–1944), American Olympic wrestler
- Robert Franz Curry (1872–1955), American landscape painter
- Robert Stafford Curry (1862–?), member of the Mississippi House of Representatives
- Robert Curry (singer), singer with Day26
- Bob Curry (1918–2001), English footballer
- Rob Curry, British film director

== See also ==
- Robert Curry Cameron (1925–1972), American astronomer
- Robert Currie (disambiguation)
