= MacMhuirich (surname) =

- Gender: Masculine
- Language: Scottish Gaelic

Other gender
- Feminine: NicMhuirich

Origin
- Meaning: "son" + "of Muireach"

Other names
- Anglicisations: Currie, MacVurich

MacMhuirich is a masculine surname in Scottish Gaelic. The feminine form of the surname is NicMhuirich. The masculine form translates into English as "son of Muireach", and the feminine name translates as "daughter of MacMhuirich". The personal name Muireach means "mariner". The surname has been borne by a noted Hebridean family of bards, who claimed descent from an early 13th-century Irish bard.

== Etymology ==
The Scottish Gaelic MacMhuirich is a masculine surname. It originated as a patronym, meaning "son of Muireach", although the surname no longer refers to the father of the bearer.

The personal name Muireach is a form of the Irish Muireadhach. These names are derived from the element muir, meaning "sea". The names have been generally translated into English as "mariner"; for example, George Fraser Black translated the names as "belonging to the sea". According to Black, these personal names are much confused with the name Murchadh, which has been translated into English as "sea warrior" and "sea battler".

== Feminine form ==
The feminine form of MacMhuirich is NicMhuirich. This feminine name is composed of the prefix Nic-, which is an abbreviated form of the Scottish Gaelic nighean mhic or nì mhic, which translates into English as "daughter of the son"; thus NicMhuirich translates as "daughter of MacMhuirich"

== Anglicised forms ==
The Scottish Gaelic MacMhuirich has been Anglicised as MacVurich. The phonetics on the Isle of Arran are such that MacMhuirich was pronounced "Ac Uiri" and "Ac Fuiri" due to elision; thus the Scottish Gaelic surname has also been Anglicised as Currie. The surname MacMhuirich has also been Anglicised as Macpherson, due to a confusion of clan-names borne by separate families (see below).

== Families ==
The surname was borne by the noted family of bards, Clann MacMhuirich or Clann Mhuirich, who claimed descent from Muireadhach Albanach, of the Ó Dálaigh bardic sept, an early 13th-century Irishman who settled in Scotland and was himself employed as a bard. According to Black, who wrote in the mid 20th century, some relations of this family currently bear the surname Macpherson. The confusion arose from the fact that the Macphersons from Badenoch, commonly known in English as "Clan Macpherson", are also traditionally known in Scottish Gaelic as Clann Mhuirich.

== Notable people with the surname ==
- James Macpherson, also known in Scottish Gaelic as Seumas MacMhuirich, an 18th-century Scot known for composing Ossianic poetry
