= Delia Oppo =

American scientist

Delia Wanda Oppo
- Education: Columbia University
- Scientific career
- Workplaces: Woods Hole Oceanographic Institution
- Thesis: The nature, causes, and consequences of thermohaline circulation changes over the past 700,000 years : variations of δ¹³C in benthic and planktonic foraminifera (1989)

Delia Wanda Oppo is an American scientist who works on paleoceanography where she focuses on past variations in water circulation and the subsequent impact on Earth's climate system. She was elected a fellow of the American Geophysical Union in 2014.

== Education and career ==
Oppo has a B.S. from the State University of New York at Albany (1981). She earned her Ph.D. from Columbia University in 1989 where she worked on changes in thermohaline circulation. Following her Ph.D she started at Woods Hole Oceanographic Institution as a postdoctoral scientist working with William Curry. As of 2006, she is a senior scientist at Woods Hole Oceanographic Institution.

In 2014, Oppo was elected a fellow of the American Geophysical Union who cited her "for her contributions toward understanding the causes of Earth’s climate variability and its link to ocean circulation and the hydrological cycle".

== Research ==
Oppo's research tracks past changes in ocean circulation, and the resulting impact of these changes on regional climate. Her research uses stable isotopes of carbon which are captured in the shells of foraminifera. In the Atlantic Ocean, her research has examined changes in deep and intermediate water circulation, and climate variability in the North Atlantic. Her research has revealed a weakening of the Gulf Stream, which may impact weather patterns in the United States and Europe. She has also investigated abrupt climate events in the past and changes in the heat content of the ocean over the past 10,000 years, research which shows that the ocean is warming faster than in the past.

=== Selected publications ===
- Oppo, Delia W.; Fairbanks, Richard G. (November 1987). "Variability in the deep and intermediate water circulation of the Atlantic Ocean during the past 25,000 years: Northern Hemisphere modulation of the Southern Ocean". Earth and Planetary Science Letters. 86 (1): 1–15. Bibcode:1987E&PSL..86....1O. doi:10.1016/0012-821X(87)90183-X.
- Duplessy, J. C.; Shackleton, N. J.; Fairbanks, R. G.; Labeyrie, L.; Oppo, D.; Kallel, N. (June 1988). "Deepwater source variations during the last climatic cycle and their impact on the global deepwater circulation" (PDF). Paleoceanography. 3 (3): 343–360. Bibcode:1988PalOc...3..343D. doi:10.1029/PA003i003p00343.
- Oppo, D. W.; McManus, J.F.; Cullen, J.L. (27 February 1998). "Abrupt Climate Events 500,000 to 340,000 Years Ago: Evidence from Subpolar North Atlantic Sediments". Science. 279 (5355): 1335–1338. Bibcode:1998Sci...279.1335O. doi:10.1126/science.279.5355.1335. PMID 9478890.
- Curry, W. B.; Oppo, D. W. (March 2005). "Glacial water mass geometry and the distribution of δ 13 C of ΣCO 2 in the western Atlantic Ocean: GLACIAL WATER MASS GEOMETRY". Paleoceanography. 20 (1): n/a. Bibcode:2005PalOc..20.1017C. doi:10.1029/2004PA001021. hdl:1912/3432.
- Oppo, Delia W.; Rosenthal, Yair; Linsley, Braddock K. (August 2009). "2,000-year-long temperature and hydrology reconstructions from the Indo-Pacific warm pool". Nature. 460 (7259): 1113–1116. Bibcode:2009Natur.460.1113O. doi:10.1038/nature08233. hdl:1912/3188. PMID 19713927. S2CID 4400041.

== Awards and honors ==
- Emiliani lecture, American Geophysical Union (2009)
- Fellow, American Geophysical Union (2014)
