= MacMhuirich =

MacMhuirich may refer to:

- MacMhuirich (surname), a surname in the Scottish Gaelic language
- Clann MacMhuirich, also known as Clann Mhuirich, the MacMhuirich bardic family

== See also ==
- Clann Mhuirich (disambiguation)
