= Donald McPherson =

Donald McPherson or Donald Macpherson may refer to:

- Donald MacPherson, Canadian public health advocate
- Donald Macpherson (British Army officer), army officer who fought in the American Revolution
- Donald Macpherson Baillie (1887–1954), Scottish theologian, ecumenist, and parish minister
- Donald Mighton McPherson (1918–1973), Canadian sports executive, businessman and politician in Saskatchewan
- Donald M. McPherson (1922–2025), American fighter pilot and last World War II flying ace
- Don MacPherson (broadcast executive) (died 1998), Canadian broadcast executive
- Donald Macpherson (piper) (1922–2012), Scottish bagpipe player
- Donald McPherson (figure skater) (1945–2001), Canadian figure skater
- Donald Macpherson (rugby union)
- Don Macpherson (journalist) (born 1947), Canadian journalist
- Don Macpherson (born 1954), British screenwriter
- Donald McPherson (singer), original singer and co-founder of the 1970s R&B band The Main Ingredient
- Don McPherson (born 1965), American academic and former NFL and CFL football quarterback
