= George Currie =

George Currie may refer to:

- George Currie (Northern Irish politician) (1905–1978), Northern Irish barrister and politician
- George Currie (musician) (born 1950), Scottish musician and amateur archaeologist
- George Currie (academic) (1896–1984), Scottish-born agricultural scientist and vice chancellor of universities in Australia and New Zealand
- George R. Currie (1900–1983), American jurist from Wisconsin
- George Currie (British politician) (1870–1950), British politician
- George Selkirk Currie, Canadian soldier, businessman, and public servant

== See also ==
- George Curry (disambiguation)
