= John Fisher (human rights advocate) =

New Zealand advocate

John Fisher (born 1966) is a New Zealand-born human rights advocate and international LGBT rights activist. He currently serves as deputy director for Global Advocacy at Human Rights Watch.

Fisher is known for his leadership of Egale Canada during a formative period in the Canadian LGBT rights movement and for his subsequent work advancing LGBT rights through the United Nations system as co-director of ARC International. He participated in the UN World Conference on Human Rights in Vienna in 1993, becoming the first openly gay person to address a UN World Conference.

== Early life and education ==
Fisher studied at the University of Auckland, where he earned a Bachelor of Arts and a Bachelor of Laws (Honours) in 1989. He later moved to Canada and completed a Master of Laws in International Law at Queen's University in 1992. Early in his career, Fisher worked as a judicial clerk at the Auckland High Court. After relocating to Canada, he became involved in human rights advocacy and taught human rights courses at the University of Ottawa and Carleton University.

== Career ==
=== Egale Canada ===
Fisher served as executive director of Egale Canada from 1995 to 2003. During his tenure, the organization expanded from a largely volunteer-based advocacy group into Canada's leading national LGBT rights organization.

As executive director, Fisher helped coordinate national advocacy campaigns aimed at advancing legal equality for LGBT Canadians. He played a significant role in efforts that contributed to the inclusion of sexual orientation in the Canadian Human Rights Act in 1996. He also worked to build a national coalition of LGBT organizations and activists to support legislative and policy reform.

Under Fisher's leadership, Egale broadened its mandate to more explicitly include bisexual and transgender communities. In 2001, the organization formally adopted the name "Egale Canada," replacing its original name, Equality for Gays and Lesbians Everywhere.

In 2002, Fisher announced his intention to step down as executive director, effective June 2003.

=== ARC International ===
In 2005, Fisher relocated to Geneva, Switzerland, where he became co-director of ARC International, a non-governmental organization dedicated to advancing LGBT rights through international human rights mechanisms.

At ARC International, Fisher worked extensively with governments, United Nations agencies, and civil society organizations to promote recognition of sexual orientation and gender identity within international human rights law.

=== Human Rights Watch ===
Fisher joined Human Rights Watch in 2015 as Geneva Director. In this role, he led advocacy efforts with the United Nations Human Rights Council and other Geneva-based international institutions.

In April 2022, he was appointed deputy director for Global Advocacy. In that position, he supports Human Rights Watch's global advocacy strategy and oversees engagement with United Nations institutions in Geneva and New York. His work focuses on strengthening international accountability mechanisms and advancing human rights protections through multilateral institutions.
