= David Currie =

David Currie may refer to:

- David Currie (broadcaster), BBC Scotland sports broadcaster
- David Currie (conductor), Canadian conductor
- David Currie (footballer) (born 1962), former Middlesbrough FC player
- Dave Currie (footballer) (1876–1912), Australian rules footballer for Essendon
- David Vivian Currie (1912–1986), Canadian recipient of the Victoria Cross
- David Currie, Baron Currie of Marylebone (born 1946), British economist, member of the House of Lords
- David P. Currie (1936–2007), American law professor
- Dave Currie (born 1945), New Zealand sports administrator

== See also ==
- David Curry (born 1944), British politician
- Dave Currey (disambiguation)
