= Egale Canada =

Canadian charity

- Formation: 1986; 40 years ago
- Founder: Les McAfee
- Type: Nonprofit advocacy organization
- Purpose: To improve the lives of 2SLGBTQI people in Canada and to enhance the global response to 2SLGBTQI issues. Egale will achieve this by informing public policy, inspiring cultural change, and promoting human rights and inclusion through research, education, awareness and legal advocacy.
- Headquarters: Toronto, Ontario, Canada
- Executive Director: Helen Kennedy
- Revenue: $5.6 million (2024)
- Expenses: $5.6 million (2024)
- Staff: 40+ (2026)
- Website: egale.ca
- Formerly called: Equality for Gays And Lesbians Everywhere

Egale Canada is a Canadian charity founded in 1986 by Les McAfee to advance equality for Canadian lesbian, gay, bisexual and transgender (LGBTQ) people and their families, across Canada.

The organization's current executive director is Andrew Perez. Past executive directors have included Gilles Marchildon, John Fisher, Kaj Hasselriis, and Helen Kennedy - first woman to head the organization.

Egale is Canada's equivalent of the US' Human Rights Campaign and the UK's Stonewall.

== History ==
Founded in 1986 by political activist Les McAfee, Egale Canada was incorporated as a federal not-for-profit organization in 1995, with a focus on education, advocacy, litigation and expert consultation.

The organization was initially named "Equality for Gays and Lesbians Everywhere". As they extended their efforts to include bisexual and transgender issues, they felt that the acronym was not inclusive enough, and therefore changed the name from the acronym E.G.A.L.E. to simply "Egale" (égale being the French word for "equal") in 2001. Egale Canada's partner organization, Egale Canada Human Rights Trust (ECHRT), was founded in 1995 as a charity dedicated to advancing LGBT human rights through education, research and community engagement.

In 2005, the organization was criticized by some of Canada's gay press for failing to submit a brief, after indicating an intention to do so, to the Canadian House of Commons' Standing Committee on Justice and Human Rights regarding the potential impact on LGBT communities of Bill C-2, a controversial piece of legislation that revised the age of sexual consent. Xtra! asserted that Egale was devoting so much time and effort to advocacy around same-sex marriage that it was missing the boat on other important issues.

In 2008 Egale blamed the Conservative government for allegedly failing to help gay immigrants from countries that have anti-gay laws, such as Iran, Iraq, Malaysia, Jordan, Mexico and Nicaragua. As of 2017, 72 countries still criminalize LGBTQ activity.

In 2009, Egale Canada presented Jaime Watt, a political strategist in the government of former Premier of Ontario Mike Harris, with its inaugural Leadership Award in honour of his role in supporting the provincial law that granted common-law marriage rights to same-sex couples. The decision was denounced by some LGBT activists because of Watt's role in some other government policies that had been unpopular within the gay community.

== Focus areas ==
Egale Canada's work falls under four pillars: Research, Education, Awareness and Legal Advocacy.

== Research ==
=== Inclusive schools ===
In 2007 Egale commissioned a survey of 3,700 high school students from across Canada in order to gain data on the situation of LGBT students in Canadian schools and gain insight into the level of homophobia and transphobia in schools. The final report, entitled Every Class in Every School, was released in 2011.[8] A decade later in 2021, Egale released a follow-up report: Still In Every Class In Every School.

=== Healthcare and seniors ===
The early 2020s saw Egale release several research studies surrounding the experiences of 2SLGBTQI people in healthcare, mental healthcare, dementia, long-term care, retirement and more. These reports include:

- Healthcare access experiences and needs among LBQ women, trans, and nonbinary people in Canada: A research report
- Aging and Living Well Among LGBTQI Older Adults in Canada: Findings from a National Study
- Queering Mental Health Supports in Canada: A Research Report
- Fostering Dialogues: An arts-based action research project imagining futures of community-based care with homecare personal support workers and LGBTQ older adults
- Coming Out and Coming In to Living with Dementia: Enhancing Support for 2SLGBTQI People Living with Dementia and their Primary Unpaid Carers

=== Employment ===
Egale's 2023 report Working for Change: Understanding the Employment Experiences of Two Spirit, Trans, and Nonbinary People in Canada, examines the challenges Two Spirit, trans, and nonbinary People individuals face in employment, underemployment, and unemployment. The report explores workplace experiences, barriers to employment, and instances of discrimination and bias. While the findings reveal that there is still much progress to be made to achieve employment equity for 2STNB people, Egale also found that some participants encountered supportive and inclusive workplaces—offering hope for the future.

== Education ==
Egale Canada specialize in three areas of education, training and learning: inclusive schools, training teachers and educators on creating schools more inclusive for 2SLGBTQI students; workplace inclusion, training corporate teams on creating inclusive places of employment; and international, working with partners around the world to deliver inclusion education.

== Awareness campaigns ==
Egale launches multiple awareness campaigns every year that touch on various topics involving the LGBTQ community. In recent years these campaigns have included LGBT occasions of significance such as Trans Day of Visibility, Pride Season and Intersex Awareness Week.

They also create campaigns around specific topics such as their 2024 award-winning campaign Help Us Remain which focused on raising awareness about the experiences of LGBT people living with dementia.

== Legal advocacy ==
=== Human rights and anti-2SLGBTQI hate ===
Egale successfully lobbied the federal government to add "sexual orientation" to the Canadian Human Rights Act to protect lesbians, gays and bisexuals from discrimination; lent support to many provincial and territorial efforts to have equal rights enshrined in legislation across the country; lobbied the Government to introduce more severe penalties for those convicted of gay-bashing and other hate crimes; supported the addition of "sexual orientation" to the grounds covered by hate propaganda legislation; intervened in the Nixon case to support the rights of transgender people.

=== Intersex genital mutilation ===
In Canada, it is currently legal to perform genital "normalizing" surgery on intersex infants and children who are too young to understand or provide consent. These surgeries are invasive, unnecessary, and irreversible, representing a profound violation of the bodily autonomy and dignity of intersex individuals.

In 2021, Egale, alongside intersex scholars and activists Morgan Holmes and Janik Bastien-Charlebois, filed an application with the Ontario Superior Court of Justice to challenge the constitutionality of Criminal Code exemptions that allow intersex genital mutilation to remain legal. This case is known as Egale et al. v. Canada.

=== 2SLGBTQI youth ===
Promoting safe and inclusive school environments for 2SLGBTQI students is one of Egale’s core initiatives, achieved through the creation of resources and educational materials. However, this work is hindered when laws and policies prevent school staff from upholding gender-diverse students' rights to equality, safety, privacy, and self-determination. Some notable cases that Egale has been involved in include: CCLA v. New Brunswick, UR Pride v. Government of Saskatchewan et al., York Region District School Board v. Elementary Teachers’ Federation of Ontario, and A.B. v. C.D.

=== Relationship recognition ===
Egale successfully lobbied for the introduction and passage of Bill C-23, which amended 68 federal statutes to provide same-sex couples with the same legal status as that of opposite-sex married couples. They also supported union activities and lobbied the federal government in support of equal employment benefits to those in same-sex relationships; coordinated coalitions of equality groups in cases on same-sex pension benefits and equal funeral leave for same-sex families.

They have on two occasions challenged the legal definition of the word "spouse." The first instance was when the group intervened before the Supreme Court of Canada to challenge the opposite-sex definition of "spouse" in the Old Age Security Act (Egan v. Canada). Although the challenge was unsuccessful, it did set a unanimous precedent by which sexual orientation was henceforth entered into the Canadian Charter of Rights and Freedoms as a grounds for protection from discrimination. The second challenge was successful, and revised the opposite-sex definition of "spouse" in Ontario's Family Law Act (M. v. H.) so that the right to common-law marriage extended to same-sex couples.

They also helped convince Statistics Canada to include same-sex families in the nationwide census, and worked with LEGIT to advance equal immigration rights for gays and lesbians.

=== Representation, visibility and media ===
Egale intervened to support efforts to have LGBT pride officially proclaimed in many cities; supported community initiatives in response to the Calgary bathhouse raids; decried the heavy-handed censorship practices of Canada Customs and helped Little Sisters Bookstore win their court case. Egale has also supported freedom of speech for people with anti-gay points of view, including Albertan pastor Stephen Boissoin, who was found guilty by the Alberta Human Rights Commission of exposing gays to hatred.[6] Part of the ruling was financial compensation paid to Egale as requested by the complainant Darren Lund (who is not homosexual), but Egale refused to accept the money.

In 2023, Egale published an open letter to the CTRC calling for the removal of the conservative news channel Fox News from the list of non-Canadian programming authorized for distribution in Canada, following Fox News host Tucker Carlson's comments after a mass shooting in Nashville that "the trans movement is targeting Christians, including with violence."

== Funding ==
Egale's operations and activities have been funded by a range of government agencies, corporations, non-profit organizations and individual donors. Notable funders include:

- Air Canada
- Appnovation
- Ardene
- Association of Registered Interior Designers of Ontario
- Bayer
- Bell Canada
- Benevity
- Blake, Cassels & Graydon
- BMO Financial Group
- Borden Ladner Gervais
- Cadillac Fairview
- Calgary Foundation
- Canada Mortgage and Housing Corporation
- Canadian Heritage
- Canadian Olympic Committee
- Canadian Union of Public Employees
- Canadian Unitarian Council
- Charities Aid Foundation
- CIBC
- City of Toronto
- Deloitte
- Department of Education and Early Childhood Development (New Brunswick)
- Department of Justice (Canada)
- Dermalogica
- Desjardins Group
- Electronic Arts
- Employment and Social Development Canada
- Fidelity
- FTI Consulting
- Fuze
- GE Appliances
- George Brown College
- Global Affairs Canada
- Goodmans
- Google for Nonprofits
- Health Canada
- Hillfield Strathallan College
- Holt Renfrew
- Home Depot Canada Foundation
- Hydro One
- Jones Soda
- KPMG Foundation
- Laidlaw Foundation
- Loblaws
- Manulife
- MAZON Canada
- McCarthy Tétrault
- McDonald's Restaurants of Canada
- McKinsey & Company
- Microsoft
- Mount Allison University
- National Bank of Canada
- National Union of Public and General Employees
- Nordstrom
- Norton Rose Fulbright
- Ontario English Catholic Teachers' Association
- Ontario Federation of Labour
- Ontario Ministry of Children, Community and Social Services
- Ontario Ministry of Education
- Ontario Ministry of the Solicitor General
- Ontario Secondary School Teachers' Federation
- Ontario Seniors' Secretariat
- Osler, Hoskin & Harcourt
- PayPal Giving Fund
- PetSmart Charities of Canada
- Power Corporation of Canada
- Public Health Agency of Canada
- Raymond James Canada Foundation
- Rockwool
- Royal & Sun Alliance
- Royal Bank of Canada
- Scotiabank
- Sephora
- Sobeys
- St. Michael's Hospital
- Sun Life Financial
- TD Bank Group
- TD Securities
- Tegan and Sara Foundation
- Telus
- TikTok
- Toronto Community Housing
- Toronto Public Health
- Torys
- Unifor
- United Food and Commercial Workers Canada
- United Way
- University of Victoria
- University of Western Ontario
- Vancouver Foundation
- Weight Watchers
- Wing Tai Properties
- Women and Gender Equality Canada
- Woodbridge College
- YWCA Canada

== Notable team members (past and present) ==
=== Staff ===
- Helen Kennedy, Executive Director
- John Fisher, Executive Director
- Kaj Hasselriis, Executive Director
- Gilles Marchildon, Executive Director
- Tamara Kronis, Director of Advocacy

=== Board ===
- Les McAfee - Founder (1986) and First President (1986-1991)
- Denis LeBlanc - Egale's second president (1992-1994)
- Alex Munter
- Ariel Troster

== See also ==
- LGBT rights in Canada
- List of LGBT rights organisations
