= George Curry =

George Curry is the name of:

- George Law Curry (1820–1878), U.S. politician
- S. George Curry (1854–1942), Canadian architect
- George Curry (politician) (1861–1947), Governor of New Mexico Territory and U.S. Representative
- George Curry (Wild Bunch) (1871–1900), American robber of the American Old West
- George Curry (baseball) (1888–1963), Major League Baseball pitcher
- George Curry (American football) (1944–2016), former American football coach
- George E. Curry (1947–2016), journalist, speaker and media coach
- Rube Curry (George Reuben Curry, 1898–1966), American baseball player

== See also ==
- George Currie (disambiguation)
