= Les McAfee =

Canadian human rights activist (1951–1991)

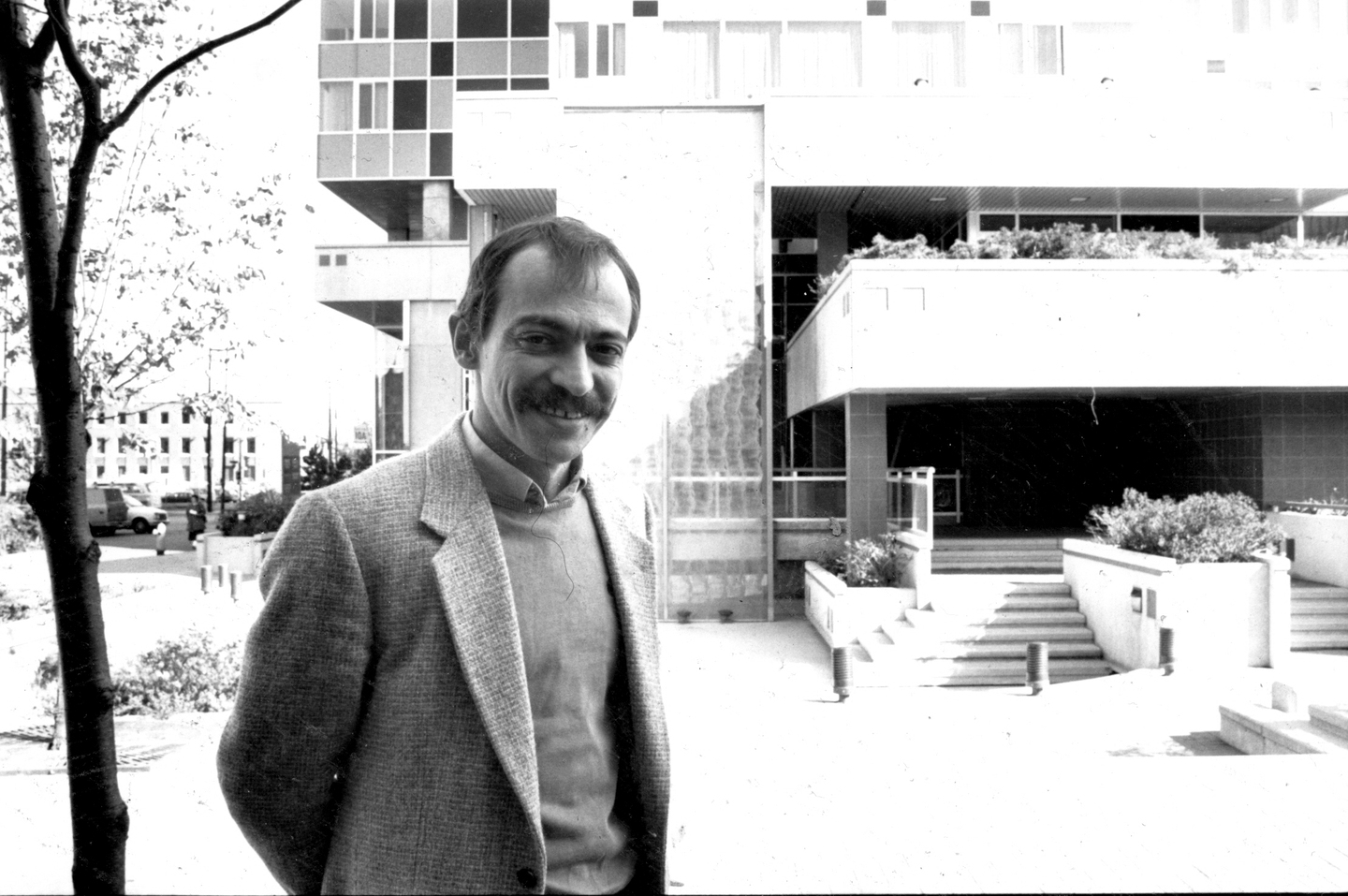

Founder of Egale Canada

Personal details
- Born: 14 March 1951 Lestock, Saskatchewan, Canada
- Died: 5 November 1991 (aged 40) Ottawa, Ontario, Canada
- Party: Progressive Conservative Party
- Occupation: Political aide, human rights advocate

Les McAfee (March 14, 1951 – November 5, 1991) was a Canadian human rights advocate and founder of the national 2SLGBTQI advocacy organization Equality for Gays and Lesbians Everywhere (EGALE), now known as Egale Canada. He is recognized as one of the early leaders of Canada's modern gay rights movement and for his contributions to human rights advocacy in Ottawa.

== Early life and education ==
Lester Duane McAfee was born to Cliff and Lena McAfee in the rural village of Lestock on March 14, 1951. He attended the University of Regina, where he completed his post-secondary education.

== Political career ==
McAfee was active in the Progressive Conservative Party of Canada in both Saskatchewan and Manitoba. During his political career, he worked alongside Bert Cadieu and served as Executive Assistant to the Minister of Mines and Natural Resources.

In 1979, McAfee relocated to Ottawa, where he became a Special Advisor to federal cabinet minister David MacDonald.

== Shades Bar ==
Alongside Bill McBurney, McAfee co-founded Shades Bar, considered Ottawa's first gay-owned bar. Operating from 1982 to 1986, the establishment became an important social and community gathering space for the city's LGBTQ community during a period of significant social stigma and discrimination.

== Founding of Egale Canada ==
In 1986, McAfee founded and was the first president of Equality for Gays and Lesbians Everywhere (EGALE), a national advocacy organization focused on advancing the rights and equality of LGBTQ Canadians. The organization later became known as Egale Canada and grew into one of Canada's leading organizations advocating for 2SLGBTQI rights, inclusion, and human rights protections.

== Canadian Tribute to Human Rights ==
McAfee later served as General Manager of the Canadian Tribute to Human Rights, recognized as the first human rights monument of its kind in the world.

== Death ==
Les McAfee died in Ottawa on November 5, 1991, at the age of 40, from lymphatic cancer and complications related to AIDS.
