= Andrew Perez =

Andrew Perez is a Canadian non-profit executive, public affairs strategist, political commentator and writer.

Since September 2026, he has served as executive director of Egale Canada, a Canadian 2SLGBTQI advocacy organization.

== Career ==
Perez was the executive director of the Canadian Association for Suicide Prevention (CASP) from 2025 to 2026.

In 2026, he was appointed executive director of Egale Canada, succeeding longtime executive director Helen Kennedy.

Perez has contributed opinion columns to iPolitics and Canada's National Observer on Canadian federal politics and political parties.

Perez serves as president and chair of the board of directors of Fife House, a Toronto organization providing supportive housing and services to people and families living with HIV/AIDS. He became board president in March 2025 and was subsequently re-elected to the position.

== Israel advocacy ==
Perez is a "a vocal supporter of Israel." He has visited Israel as a guest of the advocacy organization Exigent Foundation in 2025. He has written in the National Post that that progressives have been lied to by their leaders and institutions regarding Israel: "Israel isn’t a white settler-colonial creation. Nor is it an apartheid state complicit in genocide.". Perez shared his concerns with the Jerusalem Post that Arab Canadians are joining and influencing the policies of the Liberal Party.
