= Robert Currie =

Robert Currie may refer to:

== People ==
- Bob Currie (footballer) (1881–?, as Robert Currie), British soccer player
- Bob Currie (1918–1988; born as Robert Frank Currie), British motorcyclist
- Robert Currie (curler) on List of teams on the 2014–15 World Curling Tour

== Fictional characters ==
- Bob Currie, a fictional character from Schitt's Creek, see List of Schitt's Creek episodes

== See also ==
- Robert Curry (disambiguation)
- Robert (disambiguation)
- Bob (disambiguation)
- Currie (disambiguation)
