= Dave Currey =

Dave Currey may refer to:

- Dave Currey (American football) (born 1943), American college athletics administrator and former football player and coach
- Dave Currey (environmentalist) (born 1953), British environmentalist, writer and photographer

== See also ==
- David Currie (disambiguation)
