= Duncan Currie =

Scottish footballer (1892–1916)

Personal information
- Full name: Duncan Currie
- Date of birth: 13 August 1892
- Place of birth: Kilwinning, Scotland
- Date of death: 1 July 1916 (aged 23)
- Place of death: near Ovillers-la-Boisselle, France
- Position: Full back

Senior career*
Years	Team	Apps	(Gls)
–1912	Kilwinning Rangers		
1912–1915	Heart of Midlothian	45	(0)
- * Club domestic league appearances and goals

Duncan Currie (13 August 1892 – 1 July 1916) was a Scottish professional footballer who played as a full back in the Scottish League for Heart of Midlothian.

== Personal life ==
Currie's brothers Bob and Sam also became footballers. Currie served as a sergeant in McCrae's Battalion of the Royal Scots during the First World War and was killed leading his platoon on the first day of the Somme. During an assault on La Boisselle, he was shot in the right shoulder in no-man's land and died instantly. Currie is commemorated on the Thiepval Memorial.

== Career statistics ==
Appearances and goals by club, season and competition
Club	Season	League			Scottish Cup		Other		Total	
Club	Season	Division	Apps	Goals	Apps	Goals	Apps	Goals	Apps	Goals
Heart of Midlothian	1912–13	Scottish First Division	3	0	0	0	2 (Note: 1 appearance in Wilson Cup, 1 appearance in North Eastern Cup)	0	5	0
Heart of Midlothian	1913–14	Scottish First Division	6	0	0	0	4 (Note: 2 appearances in East of Scotland Shield, 2 appearances in Rosebery Charity Cup)	0	10	0
Heart of Midlothian	1914–15	Scottish First Division	35	0	—		3 (Note: 1 appearance in East of Scotland Shield, 1 appearance in Wilson Cup, 1 appearance in Rosebery Charity Cup)	0	38	0
Heart of Midlothian	1915–16	Scottish First Division	1	0	—		0	0	1	0
Career total			45	0	0	0	9	0	54	0

== Honours ==
Heart of Midlothian

- East of Scotland Shield: 1913–14
- Rosebery Charity Cup: 1913–14
- Wilson Cup: 1914–15
- North Eastern Cup: 1912–13
