= Gilles Marchildon =

Canadian activist (born 1965)

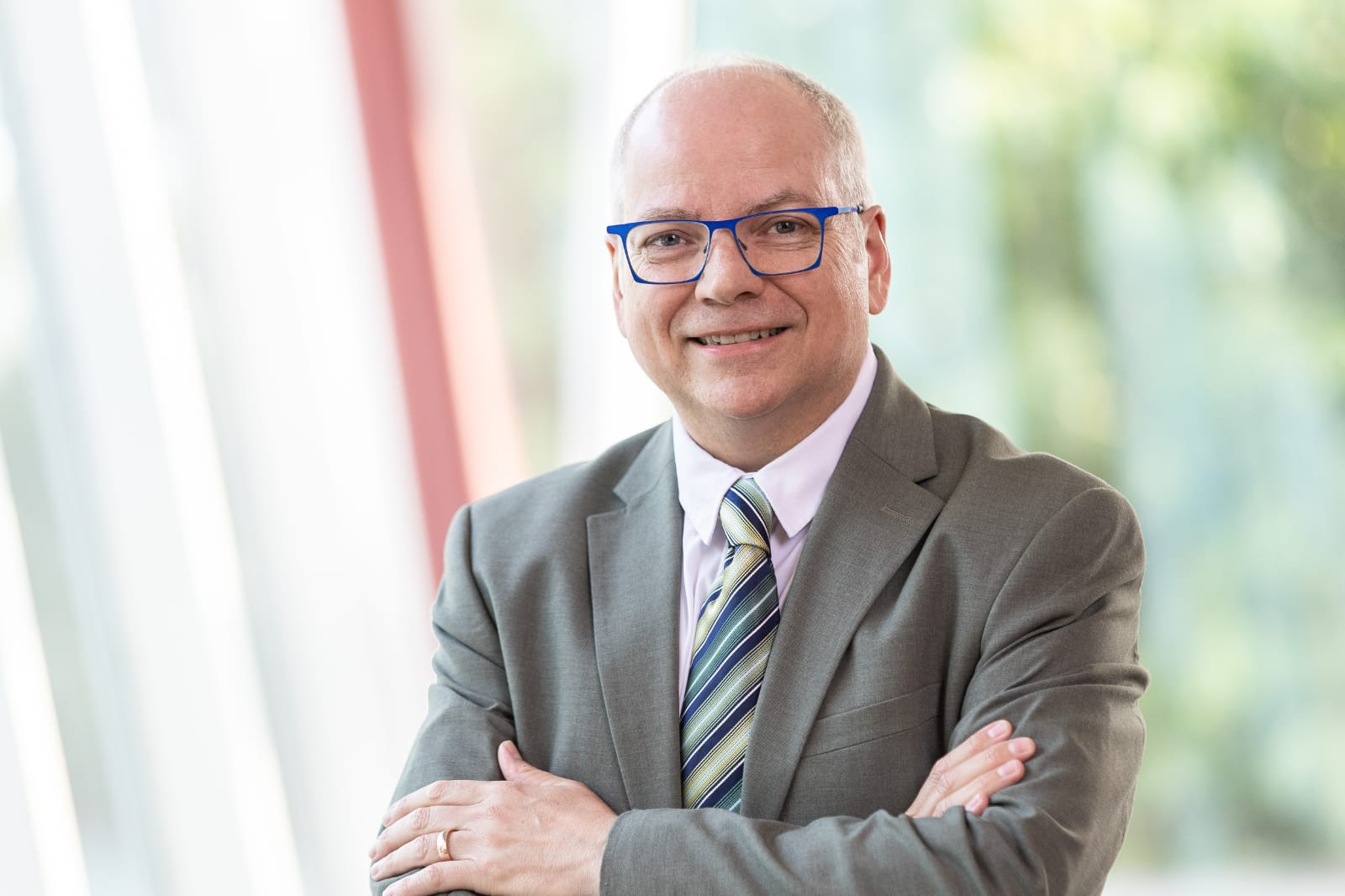
- Gilles Marchildon
- Born: May 6, 1965 (age 61); Penetanguishene, Ontario, Canada

Gilles Marchildon (born May 6, 1965) is a Canadian francophone activist and LGBT activist currently living in Toronto.

== Early life and career ==
Marchildon was born May 6, 1965 in Penetanguishene, Ontario. He studied political science at the University of Ottawa, where he was president of the Student Federation of the University of Ottawa in 1987–88.

== Career ==
Marchildon lived in Paris and Toronto before moving to Winnipeg, where he established his own communications and marketing firm, People and Ideas.

He's worked in the field of health as executive director of the French-language health planning agency Reflet Salvéo (now called Entité 3) from 2014 to 2019 and previously, from 2010 to 2014, as executive director of the community health agency Action Positive VIH/SIDA. He was president of ACFO Toronto and also vice-chair of the City of Toronto's French Language Advisory Committee. He served (2016-2022) on Toronto's Advisory Committee on Seniors Services and Long-Term Care. He also sat on the board of the provincial community foundation, la Fondation Franco-ontarienne, where he was elected president (2019-2022).

From 2019 to 2025, Marchildon worked as the Toronto campus director for Collège Boréal and was instrumental in the campus move to the Historic Distillery District.

== LGBT advocacy ==
Marchildon served on the boards of several community organizations for both the lesbian, gay, bisexual and transgender and Franco-Manitoban communities in Winnipeg, including the Reel Pride film festival and the Winnipeg Film Group. He served as editor and publisher of Swerve, Winnipeg's LGBT magazine, for four years, and also wrote for Xtra! and Icon magazines in Toronto.

He was executive director of Egale Canada during the organization's campaign to obtain recognition of equal civil marriage rights (2003 to 2006).

In addition, he is one of the three founding directors of the International Railroad for Queer Refugees, and served as its first president from 2008 to 2011.

He has also worked as director of communications for the HIV Legal Network from 2009 to 2010 and for World University Service of Canada from 2006 to 2008.
