= Donald Macpherson (British Army officer) =

Lieutenant-Colonel Donald Macpherson (born 1755) of Gaskmore and Kingston was an army officer who fought in the American Revolution, the War of 1812. He raised a regiment of Clansmen from Scotland at his own expense to fight for Britain and Canada. His nephew was Sir John Alexander Macdonald, GCB, KCMG, PC, PC (Can) first Prime Minister of Canada and driving force behind Canadian Confederation

== Background ==
Born in 1755 Macpherson was the illegitimate son of the Jacobite rebel and exile Ewen MacPherson of Cluny chief of the Clan Macpherson and grandson of Sir Ewen Cameron of Lochiel a Scottish highland chieftain and the 17th Chief of Clan Cameron. Given the unproductive lands of Gaskmore, Macpherson join the British Army in 1775 to fight against the American Revolutionaries.

== Military service ==
After being commissioned into the 71st Foot Macpherson became a lieutenant in the 4th battalion of New Jersey Volunteers. He fought with his regiment at Staten Island and New York where he was based for most of the war.

He returned to Scotland in 1783 where he raised a company of clansmen from his father's lands to fight in the British Army called the Cluny Volunteers.

== Canada ==
In 1807 Macpherson was given command of Fort Kingston in Ontario Canada where he served with distinction during the American Invasion of 1812. With his family he retired to Kingston where he became a leading member of the community. He was instrumental in bringing his sister in law and family over from Scotland and their son was John Alexander Macdonald Prime Minister of Canada.
