= Macpherson Stadium =

Macpherson Stadium may refer to:

- Macpherson Stadium, Hong Kong
- Macpherson Stadium (North Carolina), United States
