= John Macferson =

John Macferson (fl. 1731-1732, first name also Jonathan) was a minor English pirate active in the Atlantic. He is best known for a single incident involving a Portuguese ship, and for being one of the last pirates of the Golden Age.

== History ==
In 1731 Macferson and four other English sailors booked passage aboard the Portuguese pink John which had sailed from Bristol. Badly treated by the Portuguese, they took over the ship off of Terceira near the Azores. The Englishmen then met with the ship Joseph while at sea; despite the protests of some of the Joseph's other passengers, they came aboard after looting and sinking the Portuguese pink. When they arrived in America, they were arrested and the stolen goods confiscated. The Joseph's Captain, Thomas Williams, escaped capture.

That October in Philadelphia, Macferson and his four co-conspirators were put on trial, convicted, and sentenced to hang. Some sources report that they were indeed hanged, some of the last executions of the Golden Age of Piracy. In fact their sentence was never carried out: as they had only committed thievery and not murder, Pennsylvania Lt. Governor Gordon wrote to the Duke of Newcastle asking whether they should be pardoned. In April of 1732 the Duke wrote back confirming that the five had been granted clemency by the King: "His Majesty approved your having respited the execution of the said criminals, and has been graciously pleased, upon some favourable circumstances that have been represented in their behalf, to extend His mercy to them."

== See also ==
- Admiralty court – the venue in which Macferson and the others were tried and convicted
