= Don Currie =

New Zealand cricketer

Personal information
- Full name: Donald Cameron Currie
- Born: 7 July 1934 (age 92); Christchurch, New Zealand
- Batting: Right-handed
- Bowling: Right-arm leg-spin
- Role: Bowler

Domestic team information
- Years: Team
- 1959/60–1962/63: Central Districts
- 1960/61: Canterbury

Career statistics
Competition	First-class
Matches	11
Runs scored	96
Batting average	8.00
100s/50s	0/0
Top score	28
Balls bowled	1,816
Wickets	31
Bowling average	24.96
5 wickets in innings	2
10 wickets in match	0
Best bowling	6/50
Catches/stumpings	4/–
- Source: Cricinfo, 18 September 2026

Donald Cameron Currie (born 7 July 1934) is a former New Zealand cricketer. He played in eleven first-class matches for Canterbury and Central Districts from 1959 to 1963.

A leg-spin bowler, Currie's best first-class bowling figures were 6 for 50 for Central Districts in their victory over Auckland in the Plunket Shield in January 1960. He also played Hawke Cup cricket for Nelson and Taranaki between 1959 and 1964.
