= Richard MacPherson =

American actor

- Born: Richard McPherson
- Occupations: Film, television actor

Richard MacPherson (born Richard McPherson) is an actor from Hawaii, who has guest-starred on several television shows. He has appeared in episodes of Hawaiian Heat, Magnum, P.I., Fantasy Island and Lost, as well as the feature film Escape from Atlantis.
