= Ralph Stewart MacPherson =

Canadian Army officer (1896–1964)

Ralph Stewart MacPherson (March 2, 1896 - September 1, 1964) was a member of the Canadian Armed Forces, serving from 1915 to 1919 in Princess Patricia's Canadian Light Infantry (PPCLI) as a Lieutenant. MacPherson was awarded the Military Cross for his efforts in the Battle of Mons during World War I.

== Early life ==
Ralph MacPherson was born March 2, 1896 in Springhill, Nova Scotia. He was the son of Andrew Joseph MacPherson (formerly McPherson) and Jessie Isabel Yelland (née Stewart). Following his birth, his parents separated and Ralph moved to Vancouver, British Columbia with his mother and two older sisters, Mary and Jean.

== Military service ==
MacPherson joined the Canadian Armed Forces on March 5, 1915, three days after this 19th birthday. During his military service, MacPherson participated in the 1918 Battle of Mons. On April 2, 1919 MacPherson was awarded the Military Cross for his efforts during World War I.

== Post-military life ==
Following his military service, MacPherson worked at British Columbia Telephone Company for 40 years, including serving as New Westminster District Commercial Manager from 1943 until his retirement in 1961. During his career, MacPherson also served as President of the New Westminster Board of Trade, being elected in 1939.

In 1942 MacPherson was elected commander of the local New Westminster unit of the British Columbia Militia Rangers.

On September 1, 1964, MacPherson died of an apparent heart attack while driving his car along Cunningham Street in New Westminster.
