= George Selkirk Currie =

Lieutenant-Colonel George Selkirk Currie, CMG, DSO, MC (1889 – 1975) was a Canadian soldier, businessman, and public servant.

Born near Glencoe, Ontario, the son of a Scottish Presbyterian minister, Currie graduated from McGill University in 1911 and became a chartered accountant, founding McDonald, Currie & Co. (now part of PricewaterhouseCoopers). During the First World War, he went overseas in 1915 with the Princess Patricia's Canadian Light Infantry, winning the Distinguished Service Order and the Military Cross, and was twice mentioned in despatches.

Returning to business life after the war, Currie was an alderman of the City of Westmount and a member of McGill's board of governors. During the Second World War, Currie was executive assistant to the Minister of National Defence, James Ralston, from 1940 to 1942 and Deputy Minister of National Defence (Army) from 1942 to 1944. He was appointed a Companion of the Order of St Michael and St George in 1944.

After the Second World War, Currie was appointed president of Bowater Corporation of North America in 1957.
