= Robert Franz Curry =

Robert Franz Curry (* November 2, 1872 – August 23, 1955) was an American landscape painter active mainly in Germany.

== Life ==
Curry initially studied at Harvard University in Cambridge before switching to the study of architecture at the Technical University in Stuttgart in 1891. After abandoning his studies, he studied painting from 1893 at the Academy of Fine Arts in Munich, including with Heinrich Knirr and Carl von Marr. His teachers were important members and founders of the Munich Secession, which saw itself in opposition to the school of Franz von Lenbach. On many trips to Switzerland, Italy (specifically the Amalfi Coast), and the Bavarian mountains, Curry collected his motifs. He died in Riederau in 1955.

=== Family ===
Curry was the son of a wealthy American wool merchant and later owner of a steel construction company and a foundry, making him financially independent throughout his life. His mother, a pianist, had studied in Leipzig. His brother was the doctor and sailor Manfred Curry. Curry was married to Elisabeth von Wahl, the daughter of a Russian-Baltic sculptor. Their son Frederick (Eric) (1903–1971) also became a painter.

== Painting ==
Curry made a name for himself as a landscape painter. Elfriede Ruhrberg described his painting style in 2004 in a publication by the Oberstdorf Beautification Association as follows:

In the composition of his paintings, Curry preferred the principle of the diagonal, i.e., the focal point runs from the top right to the bottom left, captured by a counterpoint group in the left half, with the limiting background of the mountains. The images are placed in a tension arc through the bright, nuanced, structured colors of snow and mountains or the contrasting brown-ocher tones of trees and bushes in spring landscapes. Curry succeeds in presenting the traces and paths in the snow to the viewer in a plastic way through the pasty brushstroke.

His paintings are attributed to Realism and Post-Impressionism. He exhibited at the Kunstverein München, the Glass Palace, the art associations in Augsburg, Nuremberg, and Mannheim, in Chur, in France, and in the USA. In 2005, on the occasion of his 50th anniversary, the Villa Jauss in Oberstdorf presented an exhibition of Curry's paintings.

At least 12 of his works were shown at the Große Deutsche Kunstausstellung between 1939 and 1944 as part of the art in Nazi Germany.
