= Robert Macpherson =

Robert Macpherson or MacPherson may refer to:

- Robert Turnbull Macpherson (1814–1872), Scottish artist and photographer who worked in Rome
- Robert MacPherson (Australian artist) (1937–2021)
- Robert George Macpherson (1866–1926), Canadian politician and pharmacist
- Robert MacPherson (mathematician) (born 1944), American mathematician
- Robert Macpherson (Canadian politician) (1853–1929), Canadian builder and politician
- Robert MacPherson (BMX rider) (born 1971), American bicycle motocross (BMX) racer
