= Archibald Currie =

Archibald Currie may refer to:

- Archibald Currie (American politician), senator in the North Carolina General Assembly of 1777
- Archibald Currie (Canadian politician) (1853–1930), Canadian politician
- Archibald Currie (Surinamese politician), prime minister and governor of Suriname
- Archibald Currie (shipowner) (1830–1914), Melbourne shipowner
- Archie Currie (1933–1988), New Zealand field hockey player
