= Breanne Siwicki =

Canadian swimmer (born 1995)

Personal information
- Full name: Breanne Emma Joan Siwicki
- Born: 1 January 1995 (age 31) Winnipeg, Manitoba
- Height: 1.72 m (5 ft 8 in)

Sport
- Sport: Swimming
- Strokes: Open water
- Club: Manta Swim Club
- College team: Minnesota Golden Gophers
Medal record
Representing Manitoba
Canada Summer Games
Gold medal – first place	2013 Sherbrooke	1500 m freestyle
Silver medal – second place	2013 Sherbrooke	200 m butterfly
Silver medal – second place	2013 Sherbrooke	400 m IM
Bronze medal – third place	2013 Sherbrooke	800 m freestyle
Bronze medal – third place	2013 Sherbrooke	200 m backstroke
Bronze medal – third place	2013 Sherbrooke	5000 m open water

Breanne Emma Joan Siwicki (born 1 January 1995) is an arts administrator and artist and Canadian open water swimmer.

Born in Winnipeg, Manitoba she resided in Minneapolis, Minnesota where she received her BFA at the University of Minnesota while competing for the Minnesota Golden Gophers. Siwicki competed for Manitoba at the 2013 Canada Summer Games in Sherbrooke, Quebec. There she won six medals (1 gold, 2 silver, 3 bronze) over several events including a gold in the 1,500 m freestyle and a bronze in the 5,000 m open water race. Siwicki competed for the Canadian national team in open water swimming events and competed for Canada at the 2017 World Aquatics Championships where she finished 29th in the 5,000 m race.
