= Clann Mhuirich =

Clann Mhuirich may refer to:

- Clan Macpherson, a Scottish clan historically centred in Badenoch
- MacMhuirich bardic family, also known as Clann MacMhuirich, a family of bards to the MacDonalds centred in the Hebrides

== See also ==
- MacMhuirich (disambiguation)
