= Dave Currie (footballer) =

Australian rules footballer

Personal information
- Full name: David William Thomson Currie
- Born: 19 May 1876; Hotham, Victoria
- Died: 20 April 1912 (aged 35); Ascot Vale, Victoria

Playing career^{1}
| Years | Club | Games (Goals) |
| 1898 | Essendon | 1 (1) |
- ^{1} Playing statistics correct to the end of 1898.

Dave Currie (19 May 1876 – 20 April 1912) was an Australian rules footballer who played with Essendon in the Victorian Football League (VFL).

== Family ==
The son of William Currie (d.1923), and Mary Currie (d.1876), née McPherson, David William Thomson Currie was born at Hotham, Victoria, now known as North Melbourne, on 19 May 1876.

== Football ==
=== North Melbourne (VFA) ===
Cleared from Melbourne to North Melbourne on 2 May 1895, He played with North Melbourne for three seasons: 1895 to 1897.

== Death ==
He died at Ascot Vale, Victoria on 20 April 1912.
