= Donald MacPherson =

Canadian public health advocate

Donald MacPherson CM (born 1952) is a Canadian public health advocate who in 2010 co-founded the Canadian Drug Policy Coalition (CDPC) and was its first CEO. CDPC is a national organization based at Simon Fraser University's Faculty of Health Sciences in Vancouver, BC where MacPherson was appointed adjunct professor in Health Sciences from 2010 to 2023.

In 2019 MacPherson was awarded a Lifetime Achievement Award from the BC Centre of Substances Use (BSCU) and an Honorary Doctorate from Adler University (2019). In 2023 he received the National Public Health Hero Award from the Canadian Public Health Association, and was appointed as a Member of the Order of Canada.

== Career ==
Born and raised in Ottawa, Ontario, MacPherson completed his undergraduate degree in Applied Social Science at Concordia University in Montreal in 1982, and pursued his graduate studies in adult education at the Ontario Institute for Studies in Education (OISE) in Toronto from 1982 to 1986.

MacPherson's career in public health began at the Carnegie Community Centre in Vancouver where in 1987 he was appointed programmer and later director of the centre located at Main and Hastings. While director of Carnegie, MacPherson became involved in seeking solutions to the first overdose crisis in the Downtown Eastside, in a time where HIV and Hepatitis C were linked with injection drug use in this low-income neighbourhood. In 1997 MacPherson left his work at the Carnegie Centre and was appointed Vancouver's first drug policy coordinator. In total he worked for the City of Vancouver for 22 years, under four mayors.

In 2001, MacPherson authored Framework for Action: A Four Pillar Approach to Vancouver's Drug Problems, which was a call to action for the City of Vancouver. The document called for new approaches to drug problems based on public health principles and harm reduction with regulation of psychoactive substances.

In 2010, MacPherson co-founded and directed the Canadian Drug-Policy Coalition (CDPC), part of the Centre for Applied Research in Mental Health and Addictions (CARMHA) at Simon Fraser University. He retired from the CDPC in 2023.

MacPherson has served as a trustee, board member, and chair of the International Drug Policy Consortium (IDPC), an organization based in Amsterdam which advocates for drug policy reform, from 2018 to 2023.

== Publications ==
Over his career, MacPherson co-authored several books including, "Raise Shit! Social Action Saving Lives" in 2009, and "More Harm than Good" in 2016. Academic articles include, "The evolution of drug policy in Vancouver, Canada: Strategies for preventing harm from psychoactive substance use" published in the International Journal of Drug Policy in 2006.

== Awards ==
- 2007 - Kaiser Foundation National Award of Excellence in Public Policy in Canada
- 2009 - Richard Dennis Drug Peace Award for Outstanding Achievement in the Field of Drug Policy Reform by the Drug Policy Alliance
- 2013 - Queen Elizabeth Diamond Jubilee Medal
- 2017 - Nora and Ted Sterling Prize in Support of Controversy
- 2019 - Lifetime Achievement Award from the BC Centre of Substance Use
- 2019 - Honorary Doctorate from Adler University, Vancouver
- 2023 - National Public Health Hero Award by the Canadian Public Health Association
- 2023 - Appointed as a Member of the Order of Canada
