= Sam Currie =

Scottish footballer

Personal information
- Full name: Samuel Percy Currie
- Date of birth: 22 November 1889
- Place of birth: Kilwinning, Scotland
- Date of death: 7 December 1962 (aged 73)
- Place of death: Prestonpans, Scotland
- Height: 5 ft 10 1/2 in (1.79 m)
- Position: Full-back

Senior career*
Years	Team	Apps	(Gls)
1906–1909	Kilwinning Rangers		
1909–1922	Leicester City	236	(4)
1922–1924	Wigan Borough	33	(2)

Managerial career
- c. 1924: Wigan Borough (reserves)
- * Club domestic league appearances and goals

Samuel Percy Currie (22 November 1889 – 7 December 1962) was a Scottish professional footballer who made over 230 appearances in the Football League for Leicester City as a full-back. He captained the club.

== Career ==
Born in Kilwinning, Scotland, Currie began his career with his hometown junior club Kilwinning Rangers, with whom he 1908–09 Scottish Junior Cup. He moved to England to join Football League Second Division club Leicester Fosse in May 1909. Between 1909 and 1922, he made 248 senior appearances, in addition to a further 123 non-competitive appearances during the First World War. Currie ended his career in the Third Division North with Wigan Borough, for whom he made 33 appearances before being appointed player-coach of the reserve team in March 1924.

== Personal life ==
Currie's brothers Bob and Duncan also became footballers.

== Career statistics ==
Appearances and goals by club, season and competition
Club	Season	League			National Cup		Other		Total	
Club	Season	Division	Apps	Goals	Apps	Goals	Apps	Goals	Apps	Goals
Leicester City	1909–10	Second Division	8	0	0	0	―		8	0
Leicester City	1910–11	Second Division	32	2	3	1	―		35	3
Leicester City	1911–12	Second Division	29	0	2	0	―		31	0
Leicester City	1912–13	Second Division	29	0	0	0	―		29	0
Leicester City	1913–14	Second Division	37	0	2	1	―		39	1
Leicester City	1914–15	Second Division	26	0	1	0	―		27	0
Leicester City	1919–20	Second Division	38	2	4	0	―		42	2
Leicester City	1920–21	Second Division	24	0	0	0	―		24	0
Leicester City	1921–22	Second Division	13	0	0	0	―		13	0
Leicester City	Total		236	4	12	2	―		248	6
Wigan Borough	1922–23	Third Division North	21	2	6	1	0	0	27	3
Wigan Borough	1923–24	Third Division North	12	0	0	0	1 (Note: Appearance in Manchester Senior Cup)	0	13	0
Wigan Borough	Total		33	2	6	0	1	0	40	3
Career total			269	6	18	2	1	0	288	9

== Honours ==
Kilwinning Rangers

- Scottish Junior Cup: 1908–09
