= Tony Currie =

Tony Currie may refer to:

- Tony Currie (broadcaster) (1951–2026), Scottish broadcaster
- Tony Currie (footballer) (born 1950), former England national team footballer
- Tony Currie (ice hockey) (born 1957), Canadian ice hockey player
- Tony Currie (rugby league) (born 1962), Australian rugby league footballer

== See also ==
- Tony Curry (1937–2006), baseball player
