= Bob Currie (footballer) =

Scottish footballer

Personal information
- Full name: Robert Currie
- Date of birth: 14 June 1881
- Place of birth: Kilwinning, Scotland
- Position: Forward

Senior career*
Years	Team	Apps	(Gls)
–1900	Galston		
1900–1902	Kilwinning Eglinton		
1902–1903	Arthurlie	16	(12)
1903	Middlesbrough	3	(1)
1903	Kilwinning Eglinton		
1903–	Abercorn		
1906–1907	Morton	13	(7)
1906–1912	Bury	116	(33)
1912–1914	Heart of Midlothian	28	(6)
- Darlington
- * Club domestic league appearances and goals

Robert Currie was a Scottish professional footballer, best remembered for his five years as a forward in the Football League with Bury. He also played in the Scottish League for Heart of Midlothian, Arthurlie and Morton.

== Personal life ==
Currie's brothers Duncan and Sam also became footballers.

== Career statistics ==
Appearances and goals by club, season and competition
Club	Season	League			National cup (Note: Includes Scottish Cup, FA Cup)		Other		Total	
Club	Season	Division	Apps	Goals	Apps	Goals	Apps	Goals	Apps	Goals
Arthurlie	1902–03	Scottish Second Division	16	12	0	0	—		16	12
Middlesbrough	1902–03	First Division	3	1	0	0	—		3	1
Abercorn	1903–04	Scottish Second Division	0	0	1	0	—		1	0
Morton	1906–07	Scottish First Division	13	7	4	0	—		17	7
Heart of Midlothian	1912–13	Scottish First Division	17	1	3	0	4 (Note: 1 appearance and 1 goal in Dunedin Cup, 1 appearance in Wilson Cup, 1 appearance in Rosebery Charity Cup, 1 appearance in North Eastern Cup)	1	24	2
Heart of Midlothian	1913–14	Scottish First Division	11	5	1	0	3 (Note: 2 appearances and 2 goals in Dunedin Cup, 1 appearance in North Eastern Cup)	2	15	7
Heart of Midlothian	Total		28	6	4	0	7	3	39	9
Career total			60	26	9	0	7	3	76	29

== Honours ==
Heart of Midlothian

- North Eastern Cup: 1912–13
