= William Curry (oceanographer) =

American oceanographer

- Education: University of Delaware; Brown University
- Known for: studying historical climate and ocean circulation
- Spouse: Ruth Ann Gorski
- Children: Scott Curry
- Scientific career
- Doctoral students: Niall Slowey (1991); Thomas Marchitto (1999); David Lund (2005); Nathalie Goodkin (2007)
- Website: Biography

William B. Curry is an American oceanographer who is the president and CEO of the Bermuda Institute of Ocean Studies (BIOS). He is known for studying historical climate and ocean circulation. Curry holds a Bachelor of Science in geology from the University of Delaware (1974) and a PhD in geology from Brown University (1980).

BIOS President and chief executive officer St. George's, Bermuda

Bill Curry joined BIOS in 2012 as president and Director. Prior to joining BIOS he was a Senior Scientist in the Department of Geology and Geophysics at the Woods Hole Oceanographic Institution (WHOI) and the Director of the WHOI Ocean and Climate Change Institute (OCCI). Curry has twice served as a Program Director at the National Science Foundation in the Division of Atmospheric and Geospace Sciences – from 1988 to 1990 and again from 2011 to 2012. From 1995 to 1999, he was the Chair of the WHOI Department of Geology and Geophysics and he served as the OCCI Director from 2001 to 2005, and returned to the position again in 2007. He served on the Ocean Studies Board of the National Research Council for six years as well as numerous National Science Foundation (NSF) and National Oceanic and Atmospheric Administration (NOAA) advisory and review panels. In 2004, he was elected Fellow of the American Geophysical Union (AGU).

== Career ==
Curry was the director of the Ocean and Climate Change Institute (OCCI) at the Woods Hole Oceanographic Institute (WHOI) from 2001 to 2005 and then from 2007 until his departure in 2012. He also served as a senior scientist at the WHOI Department of Geology and Geophysics since 1981 and chair of the department from 1995 to 1999.

Curry studies the history of Earth's climate and carbon cycle using geological records of ocean chemistry and physical properties. He is actively involved with deep sea expeditions to collect deep sea sediments and uses the chemistry of fossils in the sediments to determine how climate has changed on decadal to millennial time scales.
