= Hector Macpherson (astronomer) =

Scottish astronomer and minister

Hector Macpherson FRAS FRSE
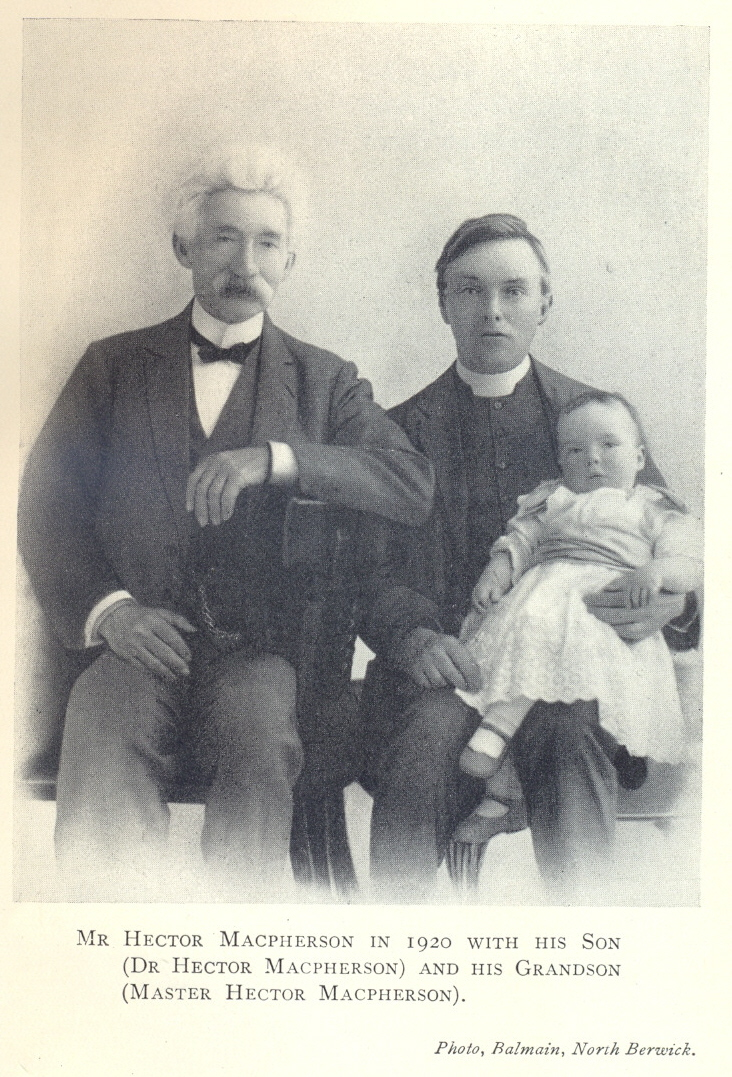
- Hector Copland Macpherson (right) with his father and firstborn son
- Born: Hector Copland Macpherson; 1 April 1888; Edinburgh, Scotland
- Died: 19 May 1956 (aged 68); Edinburgh, Scotland
- Education: New College, Edinburgh
- Occupations: Astronomer; Minister
- Notable work: Biographical Dictionary of Astronomy
- Spouse: Catherine Anne Chisholm (m. 1917)
- Children: 4
- Father: Hector C. Macpherson

Religious life
- Church: United Free Church of Scotland; Church of Scotland

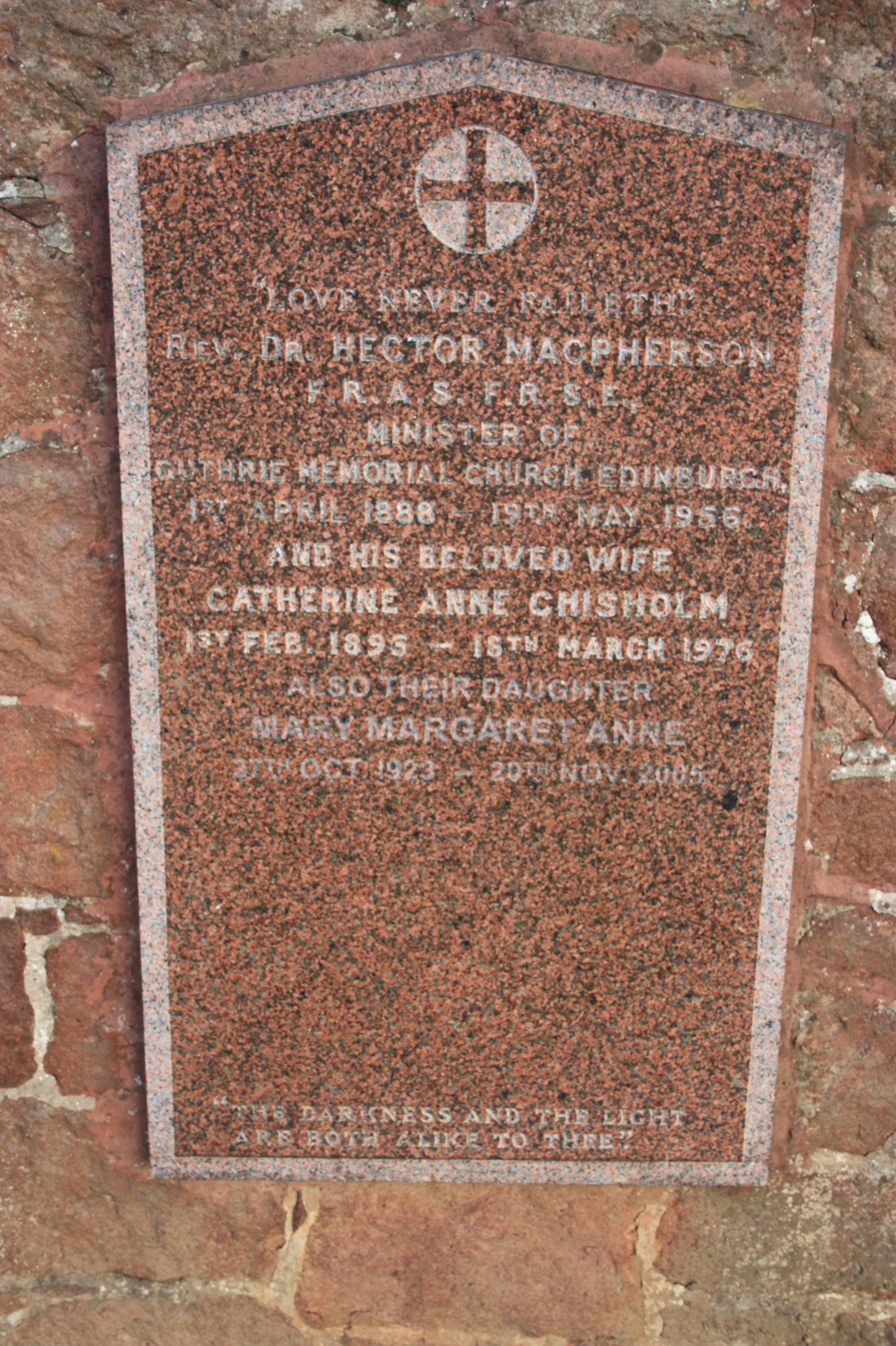
The grave of Rev Hector Macpherson, North Berwick Cemetery

Hector Copland Macpherson, FRAS FRSE (1 April 1888 – 19 May 1956) was a Scottish astronomer and minister. His 1940 work Biographical Dictionary of Astronomy was later incorporated into the Biographical Encyclopedia of Astronomers, which was first published in 2007.

== Life ==
Macpherson was born in Edinburgh on 1 April 1888, the son of author and journalist Hector Carsewell Macpherson and his wife, Mary Janet Copland. As a child, Macpherson had rheumatic fever. The illness was the reason he did not attend school. Instead, he was taught at home until he went to university. At age 13, he was given a telescope. Macpherson set up an observatory in the family garden with the gift. In 1911, he was elected a Fellow of the Royal Astronomical Society, proposed for fellowship by the Astronomer Royal Frank Watson Dyson.

In 1917 he was elected a Fellow of the Royal Society of Edinburgh. His proposers were James Young Simpson, Walter Biggar Blaikie, John George Bartholomew, and Cargill Gilston Knott.

Macpherson studied theology at New College, Edinburgh and became a minister for the United Free Church of Scotland. He served five years at a church in Louden, Ayrshire. In 1921, Macpherson returned to Edinburgh, and was named the minister of the Guthrie Memorial Church. He led the church during its 1929 merger with the Church of Scotland and served the congregation until his death. He earned a Ph.D from Edinburgh in 1923, for his research on the Covenanter movement. He served as president of the Astronomical Society of Edinburgh on two occasions: 1926 to 1928; and 1952 to 1954, and as a founding vice president in 1924/25.

He died in Edinburgh 19 May 1956. He is buried with his wife and daughter in North Berwick Cemetery. The grave lies on the eastern wall towards the north-east.

== Family ==
Macpherson married Catherine Anne Chisholm (1895-1976) in 1917, with whom he had four children: Hector, Fergus, Mari Margaret Anne, and Catherine Isabel.

== Books ==
- Macpherson, H. C. (1905). Astronomers of To-day and Their Work. London: Gall & Inglis, Publishers.
- Macpherson, H. C. (1906). A Century's Progress in Astronomy. Edinburgh: William Blackwood and Sons.
- Macpherson, H. C. (1908). Through the Depths of Space: A Primer of Astronomy. Edinburgh: William Blackwood and Sons.
- Macpherson, H. C. (1911). The Romance of Modern Astronomy, Describing in Simple but Exact Language the Wonders of the Heavens. London: Seeley and Co.
- Macpherson, H. C. (1919). Herschel. London: Society for Promoting Christian Knowledge. Bibcode:1919hers.book.....M.
- Macpherson, Hector (1919). Practical Astronomy with the Unaided Eye. London: T. C. & E. C. Jack.
- Macpherson, H. C. (1926). Modern Astronomy: its Rise and Progress. London: Humphrey Milford. Bibcode:1926marp.book.....M.
- Macpherson, H. C. (1929). Modern Cosmologies: A Historical Sketch of Researches and Theories Concerning the Structure of the Universe. London: Oxford University Press. Bibcode:1929mchs.book.....M.
- Macpherson, H. C. (1933). Makers of Astronomy. Oxford: Clarendon Press. Bibcode:1933maas.book.....M.
- Macpherson, H. C. (1940). Biographical Dictionary of Astronomers. Edinburgh: privately published by the author. Bibcode:1940bda..book.....M.
- Macpherson, H. C. (1943). Guide to the Stars. London: T. Nelson and Sons Ltd. Bibcode:1943gust.book.....M.
- Macpherson, H. C. (1955). Thomas David Anderson, Watcher of the Skies. Edinburgh: T. and A. Constable. Bibcode:1955tdaw.book.....M.
