= Bill Currie (footballer) =

Scottish footballer

Personal information
- Position: Centre half

Senior career*
Years	Team	Apps	(Gls)
- Rutherglen Glencairn
1969–1971	Albion Rovers	46	(0)
1971–1976	Queen's Park	90	(5)
- Dagenham
Total		136	(5)

International career
- Great Britain
- * Club domestic league appearances and goals

Bill Currie was a Scottish amateur footballer who played as a centre half.

== Career ==
Currie played non-league football for Rutherglen Glencairn and Dagenham. He also made 136 appearances in the Scottish Football League for Albion Rovers and Queen's Park.

Currie was also a member of the British national side which failed to qualify for the 1972 Summer Olympics.
