= Helen Kennedy =

Canadian politician

Helen Kennedy (born 1958) is a Canadian human rights advocate and former city councillor. She has been the executive director of Egale Canada (Canada's leading 2SLGBTQI organization) since 2007.

== Background ==
Kennedy was born in Ireland. She went to Canada in 1979 at age 21.

She began her career as an activist and change agent with the Industrial Accident Prevention Association. At the Industrial Accident Prevention Association, she became an advocate for workplace safety and people with disabilities, building awareness as editor of the association's magazine. In 1985, she was hired by the Ontario New Democratic Party caucus at Queen's Park. She served the party for 14 years, in opposition and government. During that time, Kennedy founded the East York Tenants Association, which lobbied for rent controls and tenant rights. She also established Citizens for Access, an awareness campaign to open up public buildings to people with disabilities.

== Municipal politics ==
In 1988, Kennedy successfully ran for city councillor in East York. Her campaign was the first in Canada to provide campaign literature on tape for the blind. She served until 1991, leaving due to the increased demands of her position at Queen's Park when the NDP won the provincial election and formed the government.

In 1999, Kennedy joined Toronto City Councillor Olivia Chow's team at City Hall, as constituency assistant in Ward 20. Following Chow's resignation from city council to run in the 2006 federal election, Kennedy submitted her nomination as a candidate for the municipal elections with Chow's endorsement. In additional to Chow, Kennedy's candidacy was also endorsed by Green Party of Canada leader Elizabeth May and Conservative Senator Nancy Ruth. The seat was won by Adam Vaughan, a former political reporter with Citytv.

2006 Toronto election, Ward 20
| Candidate | Votes | % |
| Adam Vaughan | 7,834 | 51.7 |
| Helen Kennedy | 5,334 | 35.2 |
| Desmond Cole | 750 | 4.9 |
| Chris Ouellette | 375 | 2.5 |
| Joseph Tuan | 359 | 2.4 |
| Devendra Sharma | 231 | 1.5 |
| Douglas Lowry | 193 | 1.3 |
| Carmin Priolo | 91 | 0.6 |

== Canadians for Equal Marriage ==
Kennedy was a founding member of Canadians for Equal Marriage, which ultimately resulted in Canada being the fourth country in the world to legalize same-sex marriage.

== Executive Director of Egale Canada ==
In April 2007, Kennedy was named executive director of Egale Canada. She is the first woman to head the organization.

Under Kennedy, Egale has made significant contributions towards equality through research initiatives which reveal the current state of inclusion, awareness campaigns and education programs to shift the culture of inclusion, and legal advocacy.

Under Kennedy's guidance, Egale has filled a critical gap by establishing Canada’s first and only transitional home for 2SLGBTQI homeless youth - Friends of Ruby. Helen also played a large role internationally as the former Co-Secretary General of ILGA, a worldwide federation of 1100 member organizations campaigning for LGBTI rights.

In March 2025, after 18 years in the role, it was announced that Kennedy would be leaving her role as executive director.

== Awards and recognition ==
In 2018, Kennedy received The Lifetime Achievement Award at Start Proud’s Leaders To Be Proud Of Awards. In 2023, she was recognized by Women and Gender Equality Canada as a Woman of Impact in human rights for her contributions to advancing gender equality in Canada.
