= Bill Currie (baseball) =

American baseball player (1926-2013)

- Pitcher
- Born: November 29, 1926; Leary, Georgia, U.S.
- Died: October 30, 2013 (aged 86); Arlington, Georgia, U.S.
- Batted: Right Threw: Right

MLB debut
- April 13, 1955, for the Washington Senators

Last MLB appearance
- April 30, 1955, for the Washington Senators

MLB statistics
- Win–loss record: 0–0
- Earned run average: 12.46
- Innings: 4 1/3
- Stats at Baseball Reference

Teams
- Washington Senators (1955)

William Cleveland Currie (November 29, 1926 – October 30, 2013) was an American professional baseball player. He was a right-handed pitcher whose ten-year minor league career was punctuated by a three-game stint in Major League Baseball with the 1955 Washington Senators.

From 1950 to 1959, the 6 ft (1.8 m), 175 lb (79 kg) Currie compiled a 92–72 win–loss record in minor league baseball, playing for at least six Major League organizations. His brief trial with Washington in April 1955, however, was marked by his rude treatment by the New York Yankees in his MLB debut at Yankee Stadium. Currie entered the game (the Senators' second of the year) in the fifth inning as his team's third pitcher of the day with New York already leading 7–0. He loaded the bases on two walks and a hit batsman and gave up a two-run single to Whitey Ford in his first inning. Then, in his next frame, he gave up back-to-back home runs to Yogi Berra and Bill Skowron as the Yanks added on four more runs. Currie gave up five hits and five earned runs in two innings, with two bases on balls, one hit batter, and one wild pitch in an eventual 19–1 Washington defeat.

Currie pitched much more effectively in his next two outings, also as a relief pitcher, but he was sent back to the Double-A Southern Association when the rosters were reduced from 28 to 25 players. In his three MLB games, he yielded seven hits and six earned runs in 4 1/3 innings pitched, with two walks and two strikeouts.
