= Hector C. Macpherson =

Scottish writer and journalist (1851–1924)

Hector Carsewell Macpherson
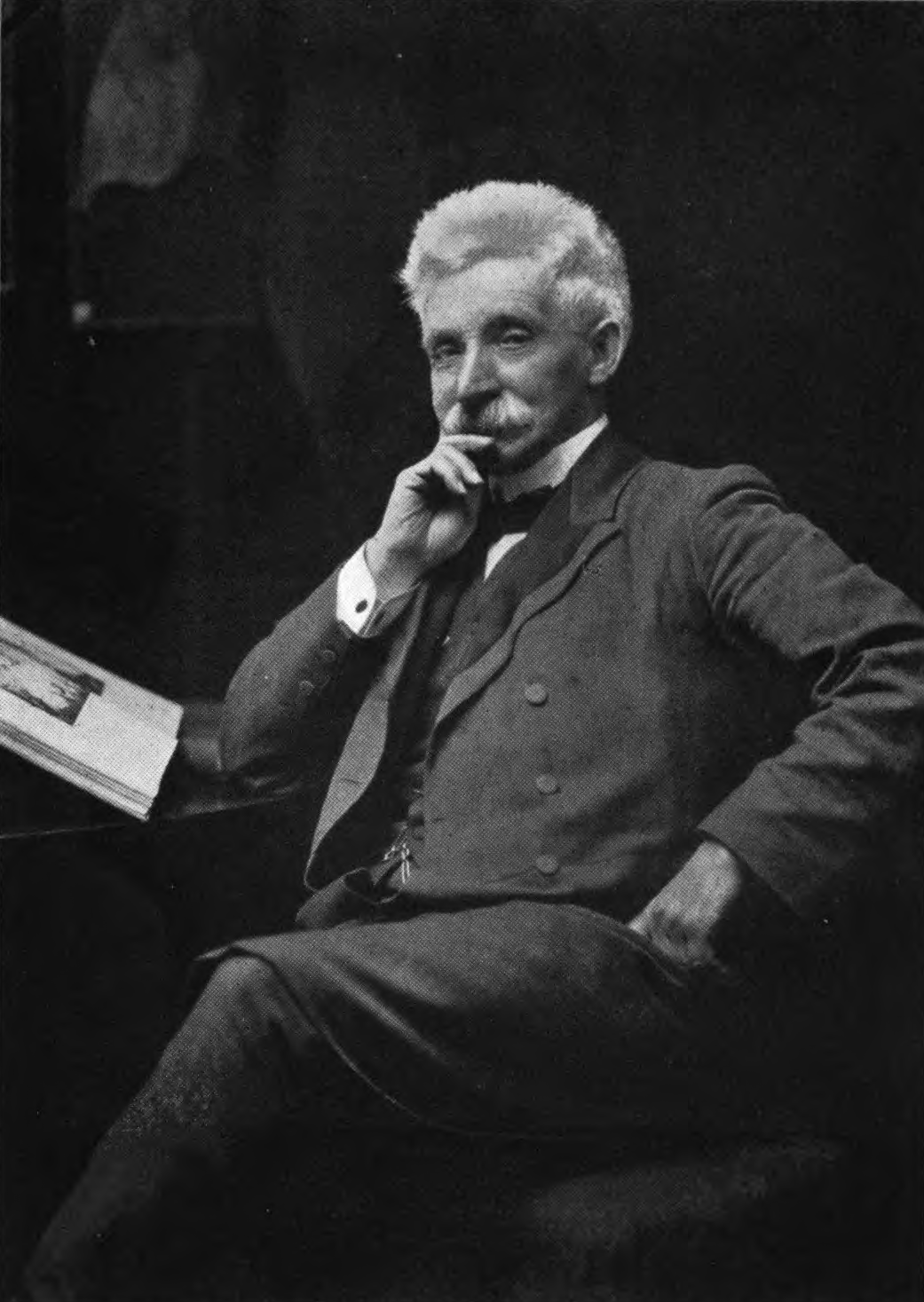
- Born: 16 October 1851; Glasgow, Scotland, U.K.
- Died: 17 October 1924 (aged 73); Edinburgh, Scotland, U.K.
- Occupations: Writer; journalist; editor; historian; biographer
- Spouse: Mary Janet Copland
- Children: Hector Copland Macpherson
- Writing career
- Pen name: Hector C. Macpherson
- Genres: Non-fiction, biography, politics, religion, history

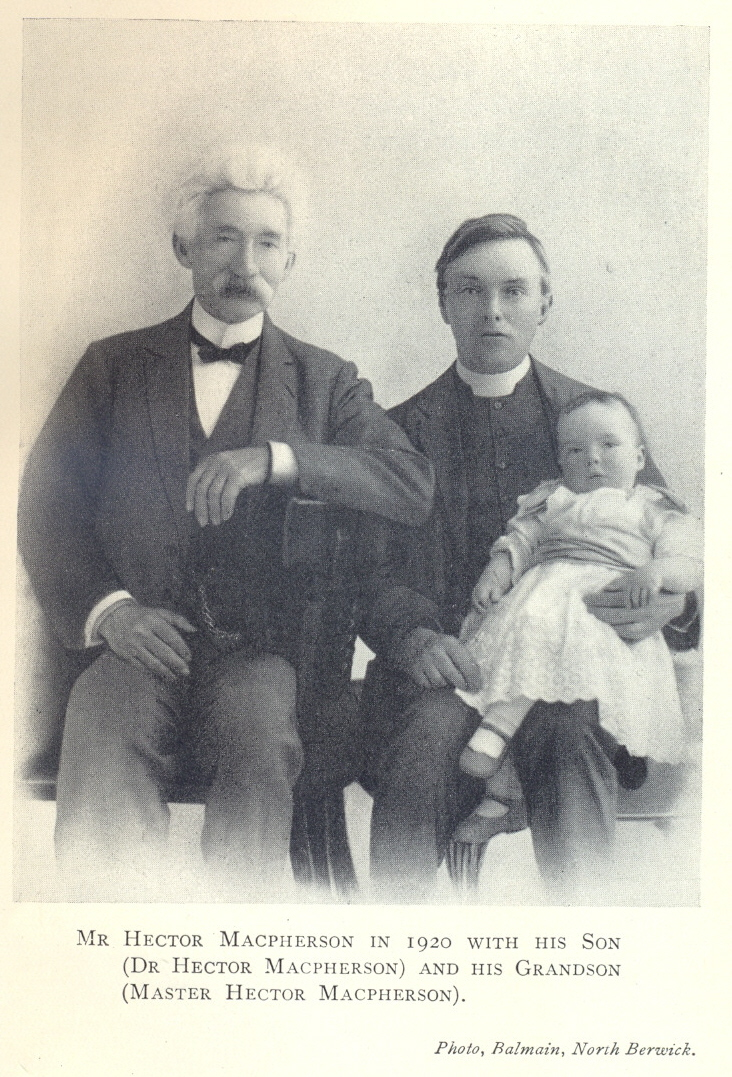
The Three Hectors Hector Macpherson III was born in 1923 and died in Edinburgh in 1981

Hector Carsewell Macpherson FRSE (16 October 1851 – 17 October 1924) was a prolific Scottish writer and journalist who published books, pamphlets and articles on history, biography, politics, religion, and other subjects.

== Biography ==
=== Early years ===
He was born in Glasgow on 16 October 1851. As a boy, he lived with his grandparents in Alexandria, West Dunbartonshire, and when he left school at fourteen he joined his father in Glasgow. He did not settle there and when he returned to his grandparents' home, he found work in the office of Dalmonach Print Works in Alexandria. Between the ages of 18 and 21, he embarked on a rigorous course of self-education using the library of the Vale of Leven Mechanics' Institute in Alexandria. He began with the study of Thomas Carlyle and passed on to Mill, Spencer, Arnold and other intellectual giants. At this Institute, he received a prize for best essay, which was entitled "The Natural Business Relations Between Employer and Employed."

In 1876, he had a series of articles published in the local newspaper, the Dumbarton Herald, which were anonymous character sketches of local clergy. When his identity was revealed to the manager of the printing works, he was eventually forced to leave his job. However, in 1877 he had a successful interview with the Edinburgh Evening News and moved to Edinburgh thereafter. In 1880, he married Mary Janet Copland. His son and grandson were also named Hector Macpherson, thus causing much confusion. His son, Hector Copland Macpherson (1888–1956), a Church of Scotland minister, had books published on astronomy and the Covenanters and these are often mistaken for his father's.

=== Journalism career ===
- 1877-94 - Journalist with the Edinburgh Evening News
- 1894-1908 - Editor of the above newspaper
- 1908-24 - Freelance journalist contributing extensively to Reynold's Newspaper among other newspapers.
- 1913-17 - Editor of the Scottish Nation, monthly organ of the International Scots Home Rule League of which he was president for four or five years.

=== Literary achievements ===
Macpherson's first literary publication was a pamphlet entitled The Right Hon. W. E. Gladstone: His Political Career, which was published in June 1892 by Andrew Eliot. Gladstone wrote him a letter of appreciation as a result. Macpherson also corresponded with Herbert Spencer who expressed surprise that he was able to write a book on Thomas Carlyle while being sympathetic with Spencer's views. Spencer regarded Carlyle's work as being "utterly antagonistic" to his own and he said that "on one occasion he [Carlyle] called me 'an immeasurable ass'."

Macpherson's son suggests that his father's "own creed was a blend of what may be called the Carlylean and the Spencerian thought, combining the moral fire of the one with the scientific orderliness and logical precision of the other." He gives us no further details concerning how this remarkable combination was achieved. However, Macpherson in his own Thomas Carlyle book attempts to reconcile the disparate views of Carlyle and Spencer. For instance, he suggests that Carlyle's 'might is right' view may be equated with Spencer's 'survival of the fittest' view.

Other works include:

- A Century of Political Development (1908)
- The Church, the Bible and War (1928)
- Herbert Spencer: The Man and his Work
- The Cameronian Philosopher, Alexander Shields

=== Political interests ===
Macpherson's politics were overwhelmingly Liberal and he gave unstinting support to successive Liberal governments. He argued vehemently against the jingoism of Rudyard Kipling, regarding him as "a foe to civilisation" who "pandered to the innate brutality of the Anglo-Saxon race". In 1901, he was involved in negotiations in the Netherlands with Boer leaders concerning the South African War. Paul Kruger told him that he didn't blame the Queen for the war: it was all Cecil Rhodes' fault.

In 1908, he published a remarkable 42-page pamphlet entitled The Gospel of Socialism arguing in depth against socialism and communism. Winston Churchill wrote a foreword to that pamphlet in which he argues that liberalism rather than socialism is the answer. Churchill finishes by saying: "They wish to reconstruct the world. They begin by leaving out human nature."

=== Religious interests ===
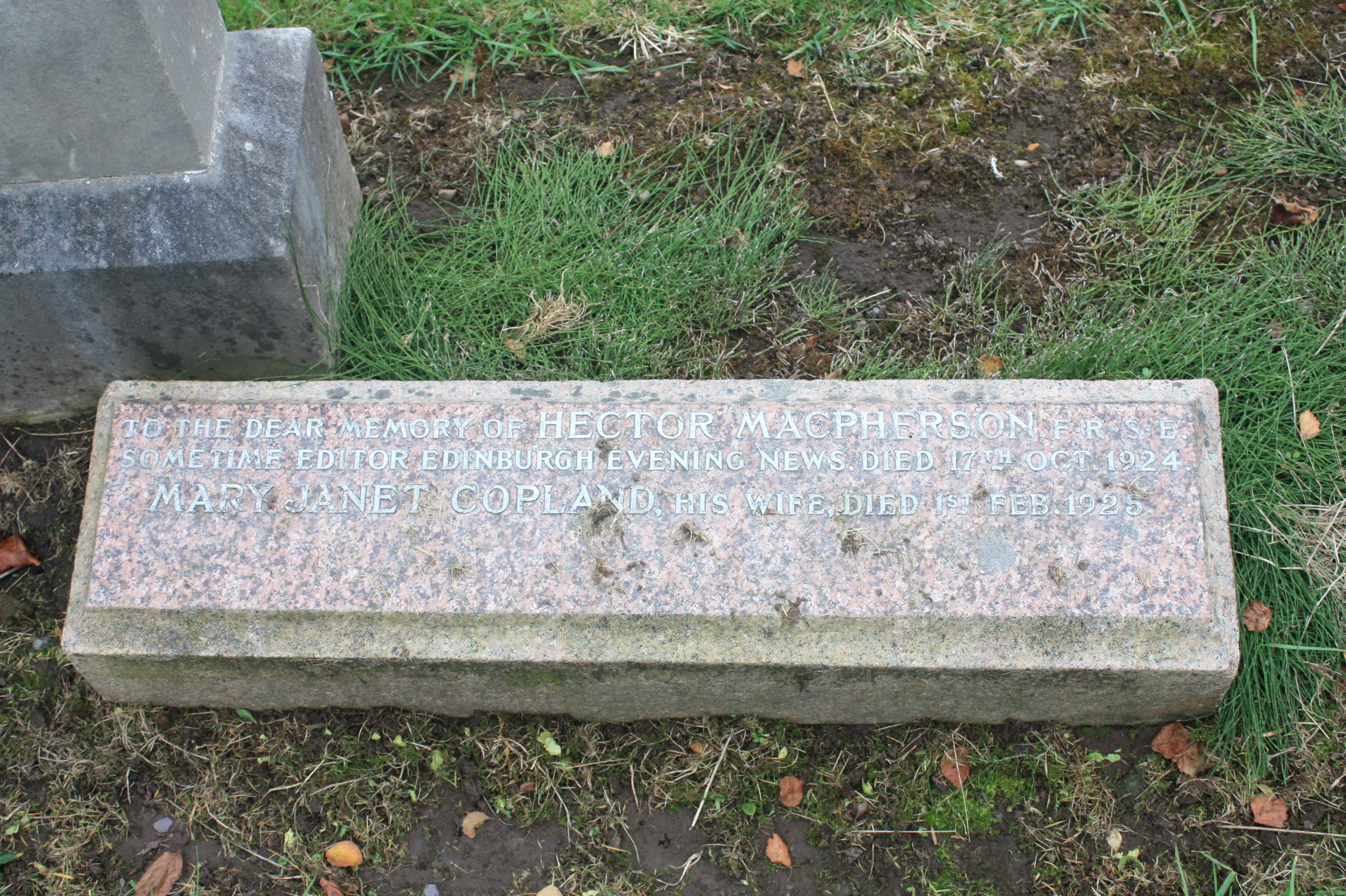
The simple marker on the grave of Hector MacPherson, Grange Cemetery, Edinburgh

Macpherson's son informs us that his father was a "convinced Theist. He sat loose to dogma, and stood for freedom of thought in matters theological." ... "In private life my father was a devout believer in spiritual realities. Very firm was his belief in the overruling care of a Heavenly Father and in the immortality of the soul. But to him religion and life were one indivisible whole. His religion may be summed up in a real endeavour 'to do justly, to love mercy, and to walk humbly' with his God." Macpherson certainly had a great interest in the history and development of religion in Scotland as evidenced by his books below.

=== Death and legacy ===
Macpherson was elected a Fellow of the Royal Society of Edinburgh in March 1924, shortly before he died. His proposers were Rev Thomas Burns, Sir David Paulin, James Young Simpson, Alexander Gault and his son, Hector Copland Macpherson (who had been elected in 1917).

Hector C. Macpherson died on 17 October 1924 and was buried in Grange Cemetery in Edinburgh.

A simple marker on his grave lies in the south-west extension to the main cemetery. His wife, Mary Janet Copland (d.1925) lies with him. They were parents to Hector Copland Macpherson FRSE (1888-1955).

== Works ==
- Thomas Carlyle, Edinburgh: Oliphant, Anderson and Ferrier, 1896.
- Adam Smith, Edinburgh: Oliphant, Anderson and Ferrier, 1899.
- Herbert Spencer: the Man and his Work, London: Chapman and Hall, 1900.
- Books to Read and how to Read Them, Edinburgh and London: William Blackwood and Sons, 1904 [2nd impression 1914].
- Scotland's Battles for Spiritual Independence, Edinburgh: Oliver & Boyd, 1905.
- The Gospel of Socialism, with preface by the Right Hon. Winston Churchill, M.P., Dundee and London: John Leng & Co., Ltd., 1908.
- A Century of Intellectual Development, Edinburgh and London: William Blackwood and Sons, May 1907.
- A Century of Political Development, Edinburgh and London: William Blackwood and Sons, Jan 1908.
- Scotland's Debt to Protestantism, Edinburgh and London: William Blackwood and Sons, 1912.
- The Jesuits in History, Edinburgh: Macniven & Wallace, 138 Princes Street, 1914.
- Hours with Great Authors, a series of essays appended to the book, Hector Macpherson: The Man and his Work, A Memoir by his son Hector Macpherson M.A., PhD, FRSE, FRAS, Edinburgh: W. F. Henderson, 19 George IV Bridge, 1925, pp. 57–177.

== Footnotes ==
=== Sources ===
- Macpherson, Hector C. (1905). Scotland's battles for spiritual independence. Edinburgh: Oliver and Boyd.
- Macpherson, Hector (1914). The Jesuits in history. Edinburgh: Mavniven & Wallace.
