= Hell's Kitchen (American TV series) season 22 =

Season of television series

Hell's Kitchen: The American Dream
- Season 22
- Promotional poster for season 22, featuring host Ramsay
- Hosted by: Gordon Ramsay
- No. of contestants: 18
- Winner: Ryan O'Sullivan
- Runner-up: Johnathan Benvenuti
- No. of episodes: 16

Release
- Original network: Fox
- Original release: September 28, 2023 – January 25, 2024

Season chronology
- ← Previous; Battle of the Ages Next → Head Chefs Only

The twenty-second season of the American competitive reality television series Hell's Kitchen (subtitled as Hell's Kitchen: The American Dream) premiered on Fox on September 28, 2023, and concluded on January 25, 2024. Gordon Ramsay returned as host and head chef, while Christina Wilson returned as the Red Team's sous-chef and Jason Santos returned as the Blue Team's sous-chef. Marino Monferrato returned as maître d'. This is the last season to take place in California before relocating to Connecticut starting with Season 23.

The season was won by chef Ryan O'Sullivan, with sous-chef Johnathan Benvenuti finishing second. O'Sullivan's victory makes him the first Hell's Kitchen winner to hail from outside of the United States.

== Production ==
On February 1, 2022, it was announced that the series had been renewed for a twenty-first and twenty-second season. Filming for this season occurred in February 2022, following production on the previous season. On July 11, 2023, it was announced that the twenty-second season would premiere on September 28, 2023.

== Chefs ==
Eighteen chefs competed in season 22.

Contestant	Age	Occupation	Hometown	Result
Ryan O'Sullivan	28	Chef	Cork City, Ireland	Winner
Johnathan Benvenuti	28	Sous-chef	Huntington Beach, California	Runner-up
Sammi Tarantino	25	Chef and creative director	Columbus, Ohio	Eliminated during finals
Carmen Florencia Ibarra	29	Chef tournant	Miami, Florida	Eliminated before finals
Dahmere Merriweather	29	Chef	Philadelphia, Pennsylvania	Eliminated after tenth service
Leigh Orleans	26	Private chef	Alexandria, Virginia	Eliminated after tenth service
Jason Hedin	35	Executive chef	Milaca, Minnesota	Eliminated before Black Jackets
Donya Taylor	28	Caterer	Long Island, New York	Eliminated after ninth service
Ashley "Atoye" Johnson	35	Private chef and caterer	Bowie, Maryland	Eliminated after eighth service
Sandra Gajovsky	39	Lead catering chef	Elmwood Park, New Jersey	Eliminated after seventh service
Devon Rosenblatt	29	Executive chef	Roanoke, Virginia	Eliminated in "Cook for Your Life" challenge
Jermaine Wright	31	Private chef	Queens, New York	Eliminated after sixth service
Raneisha Conerly	38	Executive private chef	Foxworth, Mississippi	Eliminated after fifth service
Bradley "Brad" Delgado	25	Caterer	Miami, Florida	Quit after fifth service
Melissa Irons	34	Private chef	East Saint Louis, Illinois	Eliminated after fourth service
Mattias Butts	28	Chef	San Diego, California	Eliminated after third service
Claudia Diawara	34	Private chef	Atlanta, Georgia	Eliminated after second service
Tad Walters	28	Chef	Houston, Texas	Eliminated after first service

== Contestant progress ==
No.	Chef	Original teams							Switched teams				Individuals			Finals
No.	Chef	2201/2202	2203	2204	2205	2206	2207	2208	2209	2210	2211	2212	2213	2214	2215/2216	
1	Ryan	LOSE	LOSE	LOSE	WIN	WIN	LOSE	IN	WIN	LOSE	LOSE	IN	IN	IN	IN	WINNER
2	Johnathan	LOSE	LOSE	LOSE	WIN	WIN	LOSE	IN	WIN	LOSE	LOSE	IN	IN	IN	IN	RUNNER-UP
3	Sammi	LOSE	LOSE	WIN	LOSE	WIN	WIN	IN	LOSE	LOSE	LOSE	IN	IN	IN	OUT	Ryan's team
4	Carmen	LOSE	LOSE	WIN	LOSE	WIN	WIN	IN	LOSE	NOM	LOSE	IN	IN	OUT		Ryan's team
5	Dahmere	LOSE	LOSE	LOSE	WIN	WIN	BoW	IN	WIN	BoW	LOSE	IN	OUT			Johnathan's team
6	Leigh	LOSE	LOSE	WIN	LOSE	WIN	WIN	IN	LOSE	BoW	LOSE	IN	OUT			Johnathan's team
7	Jason	LOSE	LOSE	NOM	WIN	NOM	LOSE	NOM	WIN	NOM	NOM	OUT				Ryan's team
8	Donya	LOSE	NOM	WIN	LOSE	WIN	WIN	IN	NOM	NOM	OUT					Johnathan's team
9	Atoye	NOM	LOSE	WIN	LOSE	WIN	WIN	NOM	WIN	OUT						Johnathan's team
10	Sandra	NOM	LOSE	WIN	NOM	NOM	WIN	NOM	OUT							Ryan's team
11	Devon	LOSE	LOSE	LOSE	WIN	WIN	NOM	OUT								
12	Jermaine	LOSE	LOSE	LOSE	WIN	NOM	OUT									
13	Raneisha	LOSE	LOSE	WIN	LOSE	OUT										
14	Brad	NOM	NOM	LOSE	WIN	LEFT (Note: Brad withdrew voluntarily for medical reasons.)										
15	Melissa	LOSE	LOSE	WIN	OUT											
16	Mattias	LOSE	NOM	OUT												
17	Claudia	LOSE	OUT													
18	Tad	OUT														

Keywords

- WIN = Won the dinner service
- LOSE = Lost the dinner service
- BoB = Best of the Best, usually exempt from nomination
- BoW = Best of the Worst, sometimes exempt from nomination
- IN = not nominated for elimination
- NOM = nominated for elimination
- OUT = eliminated normally
- LEFT = withdrew from competition
- HOSP = eliminated due to hospitalization
- EJEC = eliminated during service

Color key
Chef was eliminated after regular nomination
Chef was eliminated after Ramsay's nomination
Chef was eliminated without nomination
Chef was eliminated from winning team
Chef was eliminated in the Cook For Your Life challenge
Chef was nominated to participate in the Cook For Your Life challenge
Chef was eliminated during service
Chef withdrew from the competition
Chef was the Best of the Best/Worst
Chef was retained after regular nomination
Chef was retained after Ramsay's nomination
Chef's nomination was voided
The winner of Hell's Kitchen
The runner-up of Hell's Kitchen

== Episodes ==
No. overall	No. in season	Title	Original release date	Prod. code	U.S. viewers (millions)
331	1	"The Dream Begins"	September 28, 2023	HK-2201	1.77
Eighteen chefs arrived Hell's Kitchen and were welcomed inside; Oscar De La Hoya, Martina McBride, Dia Simms, and chef Ramsay all stood behind four opaque doors as voiceovers of their life and rise to fame were played, with the corresponding celebrity opening their door upon the voiceover's completion. Ramsay introduced the theme of the season--"the American Dream"--and revealed that the winner would become the head chef at the Hell's Kitchen restaurant at Caesars Las Vegas. Team challenge/signature dish: Ramsay scored the signature dishes on a scale of one-five. Leigh struggled with her salmon, as her pan was too hot and the skin was burnt; she removed it and served the dish skinless. Notably good dishes included Ryan's veal dish and Sammi's linguine with clams (both five points), as well as Johnathan's gnocchi dish (also five points), while notably poor dishes included Tad's sausage biscuits with strawberries (one point), as well as Dahmere's lobster spaghetti, which featured boxed pasta (one point). The challenge ended in a tie, 29-29, with Ryan and Sammi's dishes settling the tiebreaker; Ramsay ultimately gave the win to Sammi and the women. Punishment/reward: The women's reward was experiencing a day in a Beverly Hills mansion with a banquet-style lunch, while the men cleaned up the kitchen and prepped items for the service ahead. Jason annoyed his team by repeatedly asking them to "work and talk", with Brad in particular confronting him about it. The episode ends on a cliffhanger as Ramsay introduced the next challenge by claiming that the contestants would "hand-pick the freshest ingredients".
332	2	"Tad Overwhelming"	October 5, 2023	HK-2202	1.99
Individual challenge: Ramsay revealed that each contestant had to prepare their very own scallop dish by shucking and cleaning scallops by hand. Each team had to nominate their three best dishes and Ramsay would pick the winner from each team. The women voted for Sammi, Leigh, and Melissa's dishes while the men picked Jermaine, Johnathan, and Ryan's dishes. Ultimately, Melissa and Johnathan won the punishment passes, which allowed them to skip a punishment for a reward and choose the member of the other team to take their place in the punishment. Service: De La Hoya and McBride sat at the chef's tables while Garcelle Beauvais and Alex Mack were also in attendance for opening night, which was rocky for both teams. For the men, Jason undercooked lobster twice, while Brad and Tad undercooked De La Hoya's steak. Ramsay kicked them out after Tad undercooked chicken and Jason undercooked halibut. The women didn't fare much better as they were berated for celebrating after serving the first table of appetizers. On entrées, Carmen had trouble keeping up on fish and argued with her teammates, Sandra undercooked steak, Atoye undercooked chicken, and Ramsay kicked the women out as well after Claudia giggled nervously when they were getting yelled at and marking one of the worst opening services in the show's history since season 12. Elimination: The men nominated Brad and Tad, while the women nominated Sandra and Atoye. Ramsay first sent Sandra back in line, believing her performance was not poor enough to justify being nominated, then eliminated Tad for his unacceptable performance on meat as well as failing to make any form of positive impression up to that point. Ramsay's comment: "Tad not only believes quidditch is a real sport, but also that he's a real chef. Neither is true."
333	3	"Citizens of Hell's Kitchen"	October 12, 2023	HK-2203	1.83
Team challenge: Each team was tasked with making crab cakes, omelets, chicken & waffles, and steak & eggs for a dining room full of recently naturalized U.S. citizens. On the red team, Claudia undercooked chicken, which prompted Raneisha to take over the station; she was able to cook it without any refires. On the blue team, Mattias undercooked two steaks; he was also able to rebound and serve the diners without any further issues. The men narrowly won the challenge, finishing one table ahead of the women. Punishment/reward: The men enjoyed a poolside lunch atop a private resort while the women had to pick up confetti from the naturalization ceremony and prep the kitchens for service. Melissa declined to use her punishment pass. During the women's punishment, Melissa claimed the kitchen was free of confetti when there was a loose strand atop a table; sous-chef Christina responded by dumping one of the bags the women had filled onto the floor for the women to pick up once again. The men enjoyed the reward as a team without any infighting (aside from playful ribbing at the lunch table). Service: Victor Cruz and Bobby Berk sat at the blue and red chef's tables, respectively; also attending were Alaska and Liam Pace. In the blue kitchen, Mattias' meat issues continued when he repeatedly undercooked steaks and chicken, sometimes burning the outer edge on one side. Jermaine sent up overcooked wellingtons, and Brad ran around the kitchen aimlessly once his appetizers were complete in search of a new task; eventually, Ramsay got fed up and kicked the men out after repeated failures. In the red kitchen, Claudia served raw lobster tail for the risotto; she was able to refire it properly, but later fell behind with Donya on fish entrées for Liam Pace's table. Carmen continued to struggle on proper communication by calling out ticket times that were not agreed upon by the rest of the team. Raneisha undercooked meat twice, and when a meeting in the store room did not improve service quality, Ramsay also kicked out the women and both teams were named joint losers for the second service in a row. Elimination: The women nominated Donya and Claudia while the men nominated Mattias and Brad. Ramsay was perplexed by Brad and Donya's nominations, even going so far as to ask Donya whether she felt her nomination was fair, to which she believed Carmen should have been nominated instead. After sending the two of them back in line, Ramsay ultimately eliminated Claudia, believing she did not exhibit enough consistency or professionalism to win. Ramsay's comment: "Claudia can speak four languages, but cooking definitely isn't one of them."
334	4	"Gimme an H!"	October 19, 2023	HK-2204	1.85
Team challenge: One chef from each team was tasked with elevating a classic American comfort food. Melissa and Brad had cheeseburger, Mattias and Raneisha had pizza, Jason and Carmen had chicken wings, Ryan and Atoye had spaghetti & meatballs, Leigh and Dahmere had mac & cheese, Jermaine and Donya had lobster roll, Sandra and Devon had philly cheesesteak, and Sammi and Johnathan had fried chicken. The challenge went exceptionally well for both teams; the only chefs not to a score a point were Jason (as his wings were too salty for Ramsay's liking), Atoye, and Raneisha (who both deviated from the dish too far for Ramsay's liking). The men narrowly won the challenge seven-six; Melissa used her punishment pass, trading places with Jason in the punishment. Punishment/reward: Jason and the women were tasked with making bread by hand the entire day while Melissa and the men got to enjoy a parasailing excursion followed by dinner at a mansion in Santa Barbara. Jason severely annoyed the women with his snide remarks and comments, believing they were not working fast enough for restaurant standards. Melissa and the men enjoyed the reward as a team, with Dahmere encouraging the team to continue their hard work and reminding them that their pursuit of the culinary industry got them into the reward they enjoyed. Service: Nikki Howard sat at the blue chef's table while Jennie Garth sat at the red chef's table. Gigi Gorgeous was in attendance despite not being mentioned in this service. On the blue side, Mattias continued his inconsistencies from the previous service on the fish station, sending undercooked lobster tail for risotto to the pass twice before finally cooking it to Ramsay's standards. On meat, Ryan and Jason struggled, with Ryan undercooking lamb and Jason placing whole knobs of butter on New York strips instead of basting it with melted butter (an act which upset Ramsay to the point where he pulled the blue team up to the pass and sternly reprimanded Jason in front of everyone). The women had a very good service; the only issues were Raneisha adding too much liquid for a carbonara and lying to sous-chef Christina about it, Sammi overcooking halibut, Atoye not firing garnish according to ticket times, and Sandra not communicating with the team. After Ramsay pulled Sandra aside and warned her to get focused, the women rebounded. Both teams completed service for the first time, and the women were named the winners over the men. Elimination: The men nominated Mattias and Jason. Although Ramsay was still fed up with Jason's flippant attitude and willingness to "cut corners" for convenience, he ultimately eliminated Mattias, feeling he was on too severe a downward spiral to continue any further. Ramsay's comment: "Mattias has had three services to impress me. Unfortunately, he struck out."
335	5	"Just Bring the DARN Fish!"	October 26, 2023	HK-2205	2.08
Team challenge: The chefs were tasked with identifying four surf and turf combinations (oysters and venison, crab and ostrich, halibut and veal, & monkfish and rabbit). The women fell behind in large part due to Sandra and Donya hesitating to make choices during their portion of the challenge; ultimately, they finished with a time of 13 minutes, 14 seconds. The men fared much better by comparison during their attempt, finishing in half the time with a total of 6 minutes, 39 seconds. Punishment/reward: The men were treated to an axe throwing excursion followed by a gourmet lunch while the women had to butcher and portion fish by hand. Ramsay joined the men, offering a secret prize to whoever they deemed to be the best axe thrower (which ultimately was Dahmere; during the pre-mortem, he was gifted with a Vitamix blender by Ramsay). Melissa did not take the punishment gracefully, as she felt she had carried the challenge on her shoulders and was fed up with how the women were treating her. Service: Paula Abdul sat at the women's chef table while Dolph Lundgren sat at the men's chef table. Matt Stonie, Anjelah Johnson, and Brad Gilbert were also in attendance. Both teams had prominent issues; on the blue side, Devon and Brad twice brought up scallops after Jason had already delivered risotto to the pass, which Ramsay did not appreciate. Brad had issues calling accurate tickets, which only became worse after he developed laryngitis mid-service, and Jermaine tried to wrap wellingtons in aluminum foil to get them to cook faster (which only overcooked them and destroyed the outer appearance of the puff pastry). On the red side, Melissa neglected to communicate with her team in any meaningful manner, instead deferring the duty entirely to Sammi (who worked garnish alongside her). Raneisha and Sandra both had considerable issues on fish, ranging from overcooking scallops to undercooking halibut. Carmen sent a bland risotto, but bounced back quickly. Though both teams completed service, Ramsay declared the blue team sole winners, giving the men their first service win, while deeming the red team's service as a disaster, before asking the women to nominate 2 chefs for elimination. Elimination: The women nominated Sandra and Melissa for elimination. Ramsay asked both women why their teams had "given up on them", and after each gave their answers, he eliminated Melissa, feeling she had lost her passion and was complacent with ostracizing herself to an unacceptable degree. Ramsay's comment: "Melissa's drive completely disappeared. So I made her disappear from this competition."
336	6	"Fusion Confusion"	November 2, 2023	HK-2206	2.19
Team challenge: The chefs were greeted at a soccer field by Alexi Lalas as part of their next challenge, where they would have to pair up and kick soccer balls at targets placed in a soccer net to determine the two styles of fusion cuisine they would have to cook. Ramsay and guest judge Tony Messina reviewed the dishes. The men scored the first two points before the women scored the next three. Ryan's French-Japanese dish beat Raneisha's to tie things up, and Johnathan's Japanese-Thai dish beat Carmen's to secure the fourth consecutive challenge win for the men. Ramsay and Messina voted Johnathan's dish as the best of the day, which won him two tickets for a tour of Allegiant Stadium. Punishment/reward: The men spent the afternoon playing bubble soccer, with each of them also receiving a Keurig coffee machine. The women had to shuck peas, dice pancetta, and grate Parmesan cheese by hand to prepare carbonara for service. Brad returned from the reward feeling unwell, revealing that he had surgery shortly before arriving at Hell's Kitchen. Service: Melissa Rivers and Eric Dickerson were in attendance. The men pushed through appetizers thanks to Dahmere's vocal leadership, despite Jermaine's struggles on scallops. On entrées, Jason dropped fish too early, causing Devon to bring cold steak to the pass; however, they bounce back on their next attempt. The women also have a near perfect service except for Raneisha causing a fire on the fish station and overcooking scallops, needing Donya's help to get organized. Brad's exit: During the service postmortem, Brad admitted that his body was making it too hard for him to continue in the competition, and it was best for him to leave. Ramsay did not comment on Brad's elimination. Despite praising both teams, especially Dahmere and Donya, Ramsay still asked for two nominees from each team. Elimination: The women nominated Raneisha and Sandra, while the men nominated Jason and Jermaine. Ramsay eliminated Raneisha for her lack of improvement through five services and lacking enough experience, but praised her determination. Ramsay's comment: "Raneisha had a really strong voice in the kitchen, but unfortunately, her cooking didn't speak loud enough."
337	7	"All Up in Your Grills"	November 9, 2023	HK-2207	1.99
Team challenge: Each team was tasked with grilling various proteins (flat iron steak, chicken breast, chicken thigh, swordfish, trout, and tri-tip steak) and elevating them to a gourmet level. Guest judge Aaron Franklin offered mostly favorable reviews to the chefs aside from minor criticisms about texture and appearance. Sandra scored over Ryan on swordfish, Dahmere scored over Atoye on chicken thigh, Leigh scored over Jason on chicken breast, both Sammi & Johnathan scored on ocean trout, Carmen scored over Devon on flat iron steak; automatically giving the women the win. Finally, Donya scored over Jermaine on tri tip steak. The women won five-two over the men. Punishment/reward: The women got to enjoy an outing at Dave & Buster's followed by an outdoor lunch while the men had to clean the grills used for the challenge (which were gifted to the women) and prep for service. The women were relieved to experience a reward after four challenge losses, while the men took their punishment in stride and moved onto dinner service. Service: Rick Harrison sat at the men's chef table while G-Eazy sat at the women's chef table. Also attending service were Jane Casupanan and Jazmin Avalos. Sammi, having romantic feelings for the rapper, tried her best to keep composed upon greeting him; after her somewhat awkward introduction, she returned to the meat station and had a smooth evening. Sandra, who was also working meat, had an inconsistent night where certain meats were cooked well while others were not, however, she was able to rebound fairly well and the women completed dinner service in a respectable fashion. The men's service did not fare well; despite a promising start by Jason and Johnathan on appetizers, the men quickly lost momentum, largely due to Jermaine's inability to stay on top of garnish and failing to properly communicate ticket times and quantities. This became especially problematic for Devon on meat, as he often failed to produce the correct number of portions needed for each ticket (one table had to be sent without an individual steak due to such an error and was delayed considerably). The men were kicked out after Devon served a raw steak, driving Ramsay to his breaking point. Dahmere had another strong service, communicating to the blue team throughout the night, and was singled out as best of the worst with the sole responsibility for nominating two individuals himself. Elimination: Dahmere selected Jermaine and Devon for elimination. After Jermaine was not able to answer Ramsay's question of "who is the weakest chef on your team", Ramsay eliminated him for failing to work the garnish station properly and giving up on his team. Ramsay's comment: "Jermaine couldn't even handle the garnish station. So he ended up at the bus station."
338	8	"Cooking for Your Life"	November 16, 2023	HK-2208	1.98
Team challenge: Each team was tasked with preparing five popular ethnic American dishes (Chinese, Mexican, Indian, Thai, and Italian). Every time 5 minutes passed, Ramsay would force a chef to leave the kitchen and verbally communicate directions to other chefs. Since the red team had six members while the blue team had five, Donya sat the entire challenge out. Atoye and Johnathan were the first two to leave, followed by Leigh and Dahmere, then Carmen and Jason, then Sammi and Devon; Sandra and Ryan remained in the kitchen the entire time. When the last 5 minutes came, everyone (except for Donya) returned to the kitchen and finished their original dish, plating it as the time concluded. Everyone except Atoye and Carmen scored points on their dish; the blue team won 5-3. Punishment/reward: The women had to assemble a compost box and sort through trash the entire day while the men got to enjoy a day of rest and relaxation followed by a buffet. Leigh and Sandra struggled to assemble the box, having to tear it down before rebuilding it once more; the women did not take the punishment gracefully. Sous chef Jason arrived to the reward site as the men ate lunch, reminding them of the magnitude of the prize at hand by being one of Ramsay's executive chefs in Las Vegas and to remain focused. Cook for your life: When the teams had concluded their respective days, Ramsay called each of them individually into his office to review their performance thus far and to get their opinion on who was, in their eyes, the "weakest" chef left on their team. Ultimately, the two chosen from the red team were Sandra and Atoye, while the two chosen from the blue team were Jason and Devon. Their challenge was to make any dish they wanted to using a filet mignon as the main protein. Devon sliced his filet too early, then tried to return it to the oven after realizing his mistake; the chefs watching him in the dorms nervously berated him for doing so. Atoye's parsnip puree was not strained, leading to an unpleasant, grainy texture; on the other hand, her filet was cooked up to Ramsay's standards. Jason chose to cut his filet instead of presenting it whole, a decision that was criticized by Ramsay, but, aside from this error, the rest of his dish was executed well. Sandra's mushroom garnish with her filet was received with confusion by Ramsay; he openly stated that he had "never seen anything like it before". Ultimately, Jason and Sandra would be sent back to the dorms first, leaving Devon and Atoye as the final nominees; Ramsay would give the winning edge to Atoye, eliminating Devon by default, but praised his determination and encouraged him to keep his dream alive. Ramsay's comment: "If you're going to work in my kitchen, you better know how to cook a filet. Two words Devon will never hear from me are 'well done'."
339	9	"More Bang for Your Buck"	November 30, 2023	HK-2209	2.11
Team change: Since the blue team had 4 members while the red team had 6, Ramsay sent Atoye to the blue team to even out the numbers. Team challenge: Each team was tasked with spending $100 at a grocery store to buy ingredients that would be used to create a dish that could be maximized to the greatest profit margin. Donya was noticeably disappointed in the presentation of her New York strip steak, as it was rustic but not elegant. Atoye got a mild lecture from sous-chef Jason on the potatoes with her chicken thigh dish, as her shallots were burnt and he recommended she strain them to prevent the shallots from being served; she followed his advice accordingly. The rest of the contestants presented dishes they were content with; guest judge Suzanne Goin largely complimented each chef's dish, offering mild criticism where necessary. Atoye's chicken thigh earned $32, Donya's New York strip was $49, Jason's cap of ribeye was $48, Leigh's bone-in pork chop was $42, Ryan's scallops were $44, Sammi's filet was $52, Dahmere's rainbow trout was $32, Sandra's salmon was $34 Johnathan's pork chop was $52(with both Ramsay and Goin claiming that it was the best dish of the challenge). Finally, Carmen's seared ribeye was $40. The blue team won $208 to the red team's $207; Punishment/reward: The blue team got to enjoy an upscale "trailer park" in Joshua Tree, complete with festivities such as mini-golf and archery; the red team had to roll puff pastry for beef wellington and churn butter. Leigh mistakenly placed the butter over ice, believing it to be necessary for the process; upon sous-chef Christina discovering this, she burst into laughter while stating that they had slowed production down considerably by doing so. The blue team enjoyed a gourmet BBQ lunch at the park; Atoye was welcomed by the men warmly. Service: Daniel Mac and his family sat at a special 12-top seating arrangement for his birthday celebration; the table's orders were split in half for the red and blue kitchens. Also in attendance were Liza Koshy and Élodie Yung. Throughout the night, both kitchens performed exceptionally well; the only issues until the final table were minor communication mistakes between the two sides over the 12-top's ticket times. When each team had three tickets left, Ramsay pulled both kitchens to the pass and declared the first one to serve all their customers the winner. Sandra sent up cold wellingtons twice at the red team's final ticket, while Jason served raw salmon at the blue team's final ticket. Ultimately, the blue team served their side first, making them the winner. Elimination: The red team nominated Sandra and Donya for elimination. Although Donya affirmatively and passionately stated her reasons for continuing, when Ramsay asked her to give him the name of the weakest chef on the red team, she hesitated and attempted to dodge the question before Ramsay insisted she answer it properly, to which she answered with Sandra. When Sandra was asked the same question, she openly stated that she nominated herself alongside Donya; upon hearing this, Ramsay was dismayed and eliminated her on the spot, stating that nominating herself as the weakest was a clear sign she was not ready to win the competition. He then called Donya to the front before telling her to "wake up" and answer his questions with conviction going forward. Ramsay's comment: "If Sandra wasn't even confident within herself, how could she expect me to be? So long, Sandra."
340	10	"The Pastabilities Are Endless"	December 7, 2023	HK-2210	2.05
Team challenge: After a demonstration of balance by Jordan Chiles, each team was tasked with making four pasta dishes using five ingredients per dish which are retrieved by balancing themselves on a narrow, curved beam suspended over a pool of marinara sauce (where falling nullifies the attempt entirely). Carmen notably struggled to cross the beam in a reasonable timeframe, while Atoye and Sammi slipped into the sauce; aside from these instances; everyone else crossed the beam without issue. After the challenge, celebrity chef Evan Funke was introduced as the episode's guest judge. The blue team finished the challenge first, allowing them to start five minutes ahead of the red team. Dahmere and Atoye worked together as the blue team had an extra member. Donya beat Johnathan on tagliatelle as his pasta was noticeably inconsistent in thickness. Ryan scored over Carmen on ravioli, but Leigh defeated Dahmere and Atoye on pappardelle as the latter's red wine sauce did not complement their dish well. Despite Sammi mistakenly shaping her agnolotti into tortellini, she still beat Jason, whose pasta were severely undercooked, leading the red team to win three-one. Punishment/reward: The red team got sets of OXO brand cookware and enjoy a session of "goat yoga", while the blue team was tasked with creating and shaping 200 pounds of pasta for the evening dinner service. Johnathan declined to use his punishment pass. Carmen was noticeably confused by the concept of the reward (as goats were placed on top of their backs while kneeling in an attempt to relieve tension in certain muscle areas); the red team found the experience to be more amusing than relaxing. In the blue kitchen, Johnathan's pasta was rejected by sous-chef Jason as being too dry, forcing him to restart from the beginning; he was able to redo it on the second try without issue. Dinner service: Alix Klineman sat at the red team's chef table, while Kel Mitchell sat at the blue team's chef table. Jordan Chiles in addition to Jason's wife Thuy Santos were also in attendance. In the blue kitchen, Dahmere started off extremely vocal for the blue team on appetizers for the chef's table, however, Atoye undercooked lobster twice, forcing him to assist her on the fish station. In the red kitchen, while working on the ticket for Jordan Chiles' table, Donya's scallops get stuck to the saute pan forcing Leigh's risotto to be sent back; she corrected her mistakes on the second try. Atoye's struggles continued, after failing to communicate proper ticket times to Ramsay, he sent her into the store room and gave her a stern, yet encouraging, talk to compose herself. Carmen's lamb on the first entrée ticket was raw, leading Ramsay to gather the red team together and regroup. Jason was sternly reprimanded for sending up raw wellingtons for Thuy Santos' table, but rebounded and served the ticket accordingly. Donya also got sent to the store room after serving a raw halibut; unlike Atoye, however, Ramsay took a softer tone with her and had a very brief conversation to rebound, which she did. Though both teams completed service with no ejections, neither of them were named winners; Dahmere and Leigh were named Best of the Worst. Elimination: Leigh nominated Donya and Carmen while Dahmere nominated Jason and Atoye. Ramsay eliminated Atoye, feeling she was losing her voice in the kitchen and had gone too far for her own good, though gave her encouragement, before sending the remaining three back in line. Ramsay's comment: "Atoye's passion was admirable, but you need more than just passion to be a great head chef."
341	11	"A Hellish Food Fight"	December 14, 2023	HK-2211	2.01
Team challenge: The teams faced the famed and highly anticipated Blind Taste Test, which was space-themed. Chefs from each team stepped up to taste random ingredients with a blindfold on while another teammate sat on the hot bench as collateral, threatened to be covered by 'messy space debris' for consecutive incorrect guesses. This included milk, dustings of sprinkles, and eventually cheese as the incorrect guesses accumulated. The teams were evenly matched after the first three rounds of tasting; Ryan got two points while Carmen got one, Jason got one point while Donya got two, and both Leigh and Dahmere got two points each. With the score standing at five-five, the tiebreaker ultimately was broken in the final round; Johnathan got two points, and Sammi surprisingly scored zero. This left the final score at seven-five and the blue team achieved their seventh challenge win of the season. Reward/punishment: The men were granted a four thousand dollar shopping spree at Sur La Table, while the women were punished with cleaning up the mess caused by the challenge. Service: Hell's Kitchen was closed for a private charity service. The People Concern charity was represented by Greg Germann and was served by the blue kitchen. The Teen Cancer America charity was represented by Rosanna Arquette and was served by the red kitchen. Olivia Culpo was also in attendance as one of The People Concern contributors, while Teen Cancer America founder Rebecca Rothstein, Avantika Vandanapu, and Emily Tosta dined in the red table. For the full-course charity dinner, each chef was assigned to a course, and was tasked with leading their team and coordinating with the leading chef in the opposing kitchen to deliver their courses simultaneously to both dining rooms. While Sammi, Leigh, Dahmere, and Ryan were particularly notable for their strong leadership abilities, others including Jason and Donya struggled to manage and communicate with their teams effectively. This resulted in quality issues with their courses and the need to re-fire dishes. Despite the service ending with no ejections, both teams lost, as Ramsay felt overall leadership on both teams was lacking; Ramsay told both teams to nominate an individual chef for elimination. Elimination: The women nominated Donya and the men nominated Jason. Ramsay eliminated Donya, feeling she lacked the necessary leadership skills, but praised her passion and dedication. Ramsay then told Jason he had not given up on him, but made it clear that he was getting "awfully close" to getting eliminated because this was his fifth time up for elimination, and sent him back in line. Ramsay's comment: "Donya had the drive, voice, and was a great cook. But I'm not looking for a great cook. I need a great chef."
342	12	"A Hell's Kitchen Special Delivery"	January 4, 2024	HK-2212	2.40
Drones enter Hell's Kitchen with one delivering a special delivery to Ramsay who surprises the final seven chefs with the coveted black jacket in his hands and announces a three part challenge for chance to be one of the five chefs to receive a black jacket. Black Jacket Challenge 1: The first challenge was a game of craps to determine the eight ingredients for the first dish to cook, which would then be judged by Ramsay. Ramsay picked halibut for the main protein, and the other ingredients rolled were spinach, miso, cauliflower, broccoli, turnips, prosciutto, and truffle. Johnathan's and then Sammi's dishes were judged as the best two dishes by Ramsay, and they received the first two Black Jackets. Black Jacket Challenge 2: The second challenge was a slot machine-themed adaptability challenge. Ramsay would give the chefs 45 minutes to cook, but pull the slot machine every five minutes to reveal required ingredients. The chefs would run from the kitchen to the slot machine to grab the ingredient they wanted. Dahmere's sea bass and Carmen's scallops earned them the next two Black Jackets. Black Jacket Challenge 3: For the final challenge, Jason, Leigh, and Ryan were allowed to cook anything they wanted in 45 minutes. Jason cooked a lobster Thai-inspired curry, Ryan made a vegetarian pasta dish, and Leigh made a rack of lamb with mushy peas. Although Ramsay was impressed with the elegance of Jason's lobster dish, he felt the sauce was underseasoned and eliminated him (though he commended him for his determination and improvement). Ramsay then judged Leigh's dish as the best and gave her a black jacket; he then decided to give a sixth one to Ryan, believing his dish along with his overall progress throughout the competition justified overriding the 'five black jackets' rule. Elimination: Ramsay gave no comment on Jason's elimination, and Jason did not receive the burning picture sequence.
343	13	"#HellishHangover"	January 11, 2024	HK-2213	2.35
Challenge: In the first individual challenge as Black Jackets, the six remaining chefs were given 45 minutes to cook dishes that Ramsay would take photos of to have judged by in part by his 100 million social media followers. Ramsay and Michelin-star guest judge Kevin Meehan both judged the dishes on a scale of one to ten by presentation and taste. Ryan, Leigh, Dahmere, and Carmen all received 17 out of 20 possible points from Ramsay and Meehan, who criticized Sammi's and Johnathan's presentations. The social media followers ranked Leigh's dish as their favorite, making her the challenge winner, with Carmen as the runner-up. Leigh chose to bring Carmen with her on the reward. Reward/punishment: Leigh and Carmen got to go to the spa Muscle Lab to enjoy cryotherapy and a sauna, and then have lunch at the luxury hotel Langham. The other four chefs had to blanch and peel 100 pounds of almonds. Service: This was the first Black Jacket dinner service, with Zedd sitting at the chef's table. Also attending service were Kate Flannery, Mary Lynn Rajskub, Gavin Rossdale, and Bob the Drag Queen. Ryan only called seven appetizers for an eight-top, while Dahmere undercooked two lobster for the risotto, but quickly recovered. Thanks to Ryan and Sammi's leadership, the appetizers went smoothly after that. Leigh and Carmen served raw New York strip, but they were able to recover. Johnathan made several mistakes on the garnish, and then undercooked sausage after dropping one on the ground. Dahmere served raw and overcooked salmon while the meat station served raw lamb, due to Carmen and Dahmere shouting conflicting times over each other. Leigh then mangled a Wellington, forcing Ramsay to temporarily stop the orders and show Leigh how to slice them correctly. At this point, a frustrated Ramsay ended service early with some diners not served, and demanded two chefs nominated for elimination. Elimination: Dahmere and Leigh were nominated for underperforming on the fish and meat stations, respectively. Ramsay first eliminated Leigh for her repeated mistakes and lack of experience, but praised her improvement. He then eliminated Dahmere for being the worst performer of the night and not delegating when he needed help, but praised his passion and leadership abilities. Both Leigh and Dahmere received retrospective montages. After dismissing the final four chefs, Ramsay told Johnathan to regain his composure, and warned him to bounce back. Ramsay's comment: "Leigh needs more experience and Dahmere needs more finesse, but they both will make great head chefs someday. It's just not today."
344	14	"Don't Be Fooled"	January 18, 2024	HK-2214	2.39
Challenge: The chefs participated in a Hell's Kitchen-themed "Grand Prix" with two minutes to race with carts to pick up ingredients with four stations, with one stop at each station. At the end of the time period, the chefs learned they actually shopped ingredients for a different chef. The chefs had 45 minutes to cook their dishes, which was judged in a king-of-the-hill format. Johnathan won the challenge with a crab cake dish. Reward/punishment: For winning the challenge, Johnathan got to host a pop-up event at the Sunseeker Resort in Charlotte Harbor, Florida with two tickets at a future date. He also chose to bring Ryan jet skiing with him for the immediate reward. Sammi and Carmen had to make yogurt by cracking coconuts to get coconut milk. Service: Solomon Thomas, Lauren Ash, Sean Evans, and Jeff Scott Soto were in attendance for this service. The final four chefs took turns running the pass, while sous-chef Christina took turns running their station, with planned sabotages at each turn. Carmen first ran the pass; her first sabotage was butter nut squash puree switched to carrot puree, which Carmen caught. For the second sabotage, Ramsay switched Ryan's carbonara with noodles, which Carmen also caught. Carmen's last sabotage was Marino writing three entrées instead of four, which Carmen didn't catch. Ryan ran the pass second; his first sabotage replaced rice with orzo, which Ryan caught. His second sabotage was by Marino, giving him three dishes instead of four, which he also caught. Carmen overcooked New York strip, forcing a refire, but recovered. Johnathan ran the pass third; his first sabotage was carbonara with fava beans instead of peas, which he caught. Johnathan's second sabotage had Ramsay switch salmon with arctic char, which Johnathan did not catch. For the final test, Ramsay switched lamb with venison which Johnathan caught. Sammi ran the pass last. Ryan overcooked and then undercooked lobster tail, but recovered. Sammi caught her first sabotage, where sous-chef Christina used arugula instead of spinach. Her second sabotage had Ramsay substitute halibut for chilean sea bass, which Sammi did not catch. Elimination: Ramsay first had the chefs discuss with each other why they each deserved to be a finalist. Ramsay then asked each chef why they deserved to be in the final three. Ramsay named Ryan and then Johnathan as the first two finalists. He then chose Sammi as the last finalist, eliminating Carmen for her lack of experience. Carmen was permitted to keep her jacket and received a retrospective montage. Ramsay's comment: "It's always difficult to let go of any chef that makes it into the final four, but Carmen's lack of experience puts her one step behind the other three great chefs I have left."
345	15	"And Then There Were Two"	January 25, 2024	HK-2215	2.24
Ryan, Johnathan, and Sammi arrived at the dining room. Shortly afterwards, Ramsay called them to the dining room to introduce their final challenge: design their own menu for Hell's Kitchen, each with the help of a sous-chef. Johnathan got Jason at the dorm, Sammi got Christina at the office, and Ryan got season 11 third place finisher Jon Scallion at the patio. The final three were treated the next day to the Los Angeles Memorial Coliseum where they met Carl Lewis, followed by a helicopter ride over Los Angeles and arriving at a boutique. They then had a meal with Ramsay and were greeted by a museum of their experiences this season and two Allegiant Airlines tickets. They were then greeted by a studio audience, the setting for their menu challenge. Individual challenge: Ryan, Johnathan, and Sammi had an hour to prepare their menus consisting of a cold and hot appetizer, and a fish, chicken, and beef entreé with the aid of their sous-chefs. Ramsay brought in guest judges Giada De Laurentiis, Brian Malarkey, Nyesha Arrington, Michael Cimarusti, and Curtis Stone for each course who would rate each dish on a scale from one to ten. On the cold appetizer, Ryan, Johnathan, and Sammi received nine, ten, and nine points. On the hot appetizer, Ryan, Johnathan, and Sammi all received ten points. On the fish, Ryan, Johnathan, and Sammi received nine, eight, and eight points. On the chicken entreé, Ryan, Johnathan, and Sammi received ten, nine, and nine points. Finally on the beef entreé, Ryan, Johnathan, and Sammi received ten, nine, and nine points. With a final total of 48, 46, and 45 points, Ryan and Johnathan advanced to the finale, eliminating Sammi. Ryan received the first choice among the top ten chefs to draft a brigade for the final dinner service by having the highest score. Ryan picked Sammi, Jason, Carmen, and Sandra for his brigade. Johnathan picked Dahmere, Donya, Leigh, and was left with Atoye.
346	16	"One Hell of an American Dream"	January 25, 2024	HK-2216	2.00
After Ryan and Johnathan prepared their teams, Ramsay summoned them individually into his office to spend time with their families. Ryan worked in the red kitchen and Johnathan worked in the blue kitchen. Ramsay gave Ryan and Johnathan their head chef's jackets and thereby commenced the final dinner service. Service: This was the final dinner service, which went extremely well for both kitchens. Dahmere undercooked his first attempt at lamb, then later served a raw New York strip with cold sauce, forcing Johnathan to switch him to garnish in exchange for Donya, whose refire was successful. Appetizers went smoothly for Ryan, except for Sandra serving unevenly seared scallops for his father, but she recovered. On the final table, Jason recovered after serving undercooked chicken. Ramsay called Ryan and Johnathan into his office for the last time, offering praise for their accomplishments throughout the season, and asked them to stand in front of two doors. Ryan's door opened, making him the 22nd winner of Hell's Kitchen. Ryan thanked everybody in a victory speech, and Johnathan took his defeat graciously. Ramsay's comment: "Ryan is everything I could want in a head chef. I don't think I've ever met a more passionate chef. He's also very creative and a tremendous leader. His journey from Cork, Ireland is proof that the American Dream is alive and well. Ryan will be a wonderful asset to Hell's Kitchen Las Vegas."
