= Hell's Kitchen (American TV series) season 24 =

Season of television series

Hell's Kitchen: Battle of the States
- Season 24
- Promotional poster for season 24, featuring host Ramsay
- Hosted by: Gordon Ramsay
- No. of contestants: 20
- Winner: Ellie Parker
- Runner-up: Jada Vidal
- No. of episodes: 16

Release
- Original network: Fox
- Original release: September 25, 2025 – January 22, 2026

Season chronology
- ← Previous; Head Chefs Only Next → 25 Seasons of Fire

The twenty-fourth season of the American competitive reality television series Hell's Kitchen (subtitled as Hell's Kitchen: Battle of the States) premiered on Fox on September 25, 2025, and concluded on January 22, 2026. Gordon Ramsay returned as host and head chef, while Michelle Tribble returned as the Red Team's sous-chef and James Avery returned as the Blue Team's sous-chef. Marino Monferrato returned as maître d'. All of the episodes, like the previous season, were filmed at Foxwoods Resort Casino in Ledyard, Connecticut where the winner became head chef at the Hell's Kitchen Restaurant in addition to receiving $250,000.

The season was won by sous-chef Ellie Parker, with fellow sous-chef Jada Vidal finishing second.

== Production ==
On March 26, 2024, it was announced that Hell's Kitchen was renewed for a twenty-third and twenty-fourth season, with the twenty-fourth season, subtitled Battle of the States, premiering on September 25, 2025.

== Chefs ==
Twenty chefs competed in Season 24, consisting of each chef being from a different state.

Contestant	Age	Occupation	Hometown	Result
Ellie Parker	25	Sous-chef	Las Vegas, Nevada	Winner
Jada Vidal	22	Sous-chef	Tampa, Florida	Runner-up
Cydni Stickney	26	Executive sous-chef	Raleigh, North Carolina	Eliminated during finals
Lisa Rivera	28	Chef instructor	Orange County, California	Eliminated before finals
Anaiya Marie Lane	22	Sous-chef	Wilmington, Delaware	Eliminated after tenth service
Anthony Leonard	24	Food truck owner	Cedar Rapids, Iowa	Eliminated before Black Jackets
Henry Johnson	35	Executive chef	Dallas, Texas	Eliminated before Black Jackets
Jayden Canady	26	Sous-chef	Martha's Vineyard, Massachusetts	Eliminated after ninth service
Chris Faison	38	Lead culinary instructor	Rahway, New Jersey	Eliminated after eighth service
Alexandra Jones	43	Executive chef	Portland, Oregon	Eliminated after seventh service
Cara Marie Hall	37	Executive chef	Lincoln, Rhode Island	Eliminated on the Cook for Your Life challenge
Jonathan "Jon" Boyd	37	Corporate chef	Newnan, Georgia	Eliminated after sixth service
Antonio Wormley	33	Executive chef	Center Barnstead, New Hampshire	Eliminated after fifth service
Bradley Wildridge	31	Owner	Alexandria, Louisiana	Eliminated after fourth service
Catina "Cat" Smith	38	Private chef	Baltimore, Maryland	Eliminated after third service
Elaina Ruth	29	Line cook	Spartanburg, South Carolina	Eliminated after second service
Paul Seikel	33	Sous-chef	Broomfield, Colorado	Eliminated after second service
Chase Cardoza	34	Executive chef	Red Lodge, Montana	Quit after Breakfast Service Challenge
Maddy Bender	21	Catering chef	Rocky Point, New York	Eliminated after first service
Carlos Walker	33	Executive chef	Anchorage, Alaska	Eliminated after Scallop challenge

== Contestant progress ==
No.	Chef	Original teams						Switched teams						Individuals			Finals
No.	Chef	2401/2402		2403	2404	2405	2406	2407	2408	2409	2410	2411	2412	2413	2414	2415	2416
1	Ellie	IN	LOSE	LOSE	LOSE	WIN	WIN	LOSE	NOM	LOSE	WIN	WIN	IN	IN	IN	IN	WINNER
2	Jada	IN	LOSE	LOSE	LOSE	WIN	WIN	LOSE	IN	LOSE	LOSE	LOSE	IN	IN	IN	IN	RUNNER-UP
3	Cydni	IN	LOSE	LOSE	LOSE	WIN	WIN	NOM	IN	LOSE	WIN	WIN	IN	NOM	IN	OUT	Ellie's team
4	Lisa	IN	LOSE	LOSE	LOSE	WIN	WIN	LOSE	IN	LOSE	WIN	WIN	IN	IN	OUT		Ellie's team
5	Anaiya	BoB	LOSE	LOSE	LOSE	WIN	WIN	LOSE	IN	NOM	WIN	WIN	IN	OUT			Jada's team
6	Anthony	IN	LOSE	LOSE	WIN	NOM	LOSE	LOSE	IN	LOSE	LOSE	NOM	OUT				Jada's team
7	Henry	IN	LOSE	LOSE	WIN	LOSE	LOSE	NOM	IN	LOSE	LOSE	BoW	OUT				Jada's team
8	Jayden	IN	LOSE	LOSE	WIN	NOM	LOSE	LOSE	NOM	NOM	LOSE	OUT					Ellie's team
9	Chris	BoB	LOSE	LOSE	WIN	LOSE	LOSE	LOSE	NOM	NOM	OUT (Note: Chris was eliminated in the post-mortem, without nomination)						Jada's team
10	Alexandra	IN	LOSE	NOM	NOM	WIN	WIN	NOM	IN	OUT							Ellie's team
11	Cara Marie	NOM (Note: Chef was nominated as one of the weakest in the Scallop challenge)	LOSE	LOSE	NOM	WIN	WIN	LOSE	OUT								
12	Jon	IN	LOSE	LOSE	WIN	LOSE	NOM	OUT									
13	Antonio	IN	LOSE	NOM	WIN	LOSE	OUT										
14	Bradley	IN	NOM	LOSE	WIN	OUT											
15	Cat	IN	NOM	LOSE	OUT												
16	Elaina	IN	LOSE	OUT													
17	Paul	IN	LOSE	OUT													
18	Chase	NOM	NOM	LEFT													
19	Maddy	NOM	OUT														
20	Carlos	OUT (Note: Carlos was eliminated in the Scallop challenge)															

Keywords

- WIN = Won the dinner service
- LOSE = Lost the dinner service
- BoB = Best of the Best, usually exempt from nomination
- BoW = Best of the Worst, sometimes exempt from nomination
- IN = not nominated for elimination
- NOM = nominated for elimination
- OUT = eliminated normally
- LEFT = withdrew from competition
- HOSP = eliminated due to hospitalization
- EJEC = eliminated during service

Color key
Chef was eliminated after regular nomination
Chef was eliminated after Ramsay's nomination
Chef was eliminated without nomination
Chef was eliminated from winning team
Chef was eliminated in the Cook For Your Life challenge
Chef was nominated to participate in the Cook For Your Life challenge
Chef was eliminated during service
Chef withdrew from the competition
Chef was the Best of the Best/Worst
Chef was retained after regular nomination
Chef was retained after Ramsay's nomination
Chef's nomination was voided
The winner of Hell's Kitchen
The runner-up of Hell's Kitchen

== Episodes ==
No. overall	No. in season	Title	Original release date	Prod. code	U.S. viewers (millions)
363	1	"Making a State-ment"	September 25, 2025	HK-2401	1.43
50 chefs, one from each state, were invited to Foxwoods where Chef Ramsay, sous-chef James, and sous-chef Michelle announced the 20 chefs selected to compete in the new season. Team challenge/signature dish: Ramsay scored the signature dishes on a scale of one to five. The challenge ended with both teams tied at 38 points; Ramsay selected Lisa's dish as the best over Bradley's, giving the women the victory. Punishment/reward: The women enjoyed a yacht excursion with Ramsay, while the men prepared the dining room for service. The episode ended in a cliffhanger with a large crate dropping from the ceiling.
364	2	"Hell on a Halfshell"	October 2, 2025	HK-2402	1.73
Challenge: Ramsay then introduced the first individual challenge, where the chefs would have to cook their own scallop dishes. He instructed sous-chefs James and Michelle to taste their dishes and determine the best and worst dishes from their teams. After tasting the seven best dishes, Ramsay picked Chris and Anaiya as the best on their respective teams and awarded both of them a punishment pass. Elimination: Cara Marie, Carlos, Chase, and Maddy's dishes were deemed the worst before Ramsay ultimately eliminated Carlos for overcooking his scallops and his poor performance in the Signature Dish challenge. Service: The men had a slow and rocky start to their service due to Chase struggling to cook the flatbreads (to the point where they ran out of cheese and had to remove it from the menu) and Bradley failing to communicate while being overwhelmed at the risotto station. Cat cooked some of her scallops early but bounced back. Maddy had a hard time remembering Ramsay's calls for entrées and struggled with cooking the salmon as everyone barked orders at her. Henry served raw lamb but recovered. Ramsay kicked the women out of the kitchen after Maddy brought up another overcooked salmon and Cat served raw pork, and then the men after they served entrées that were not on order. Elimination: For the women, Jada nominated Maddy and Cat for their performance on fish and meat and for the men, Anthony nominated Chase and Bradley for their slow start on appetizers. Ramsay sent Cat back in line and eliminated Maddy for her poor performance on fish, lack of confidence, and being less experienced than the other chefs. Ramsay's comment: "New Yorkers may be tough, but properly cooked salmon shouldn't be. Maddy is gone because she wasn't able to figure that out."
365	3	"The Heat Is Coming to Hell's Kitchen"	October 9, 2025	HK-2403	1.64
Team Challenge: Both teams had to cook breakfast for the local police force. Whoever would complete their orders first would win the challenge. The men were relatively consistent throughout the service, while the women struggled due to Cat undercooking the eggs and Cara Marie serving rare steak. The men ultimately won the challenge. Chase's exit: Chase became too stressed from the competition and chose to leave to focus on his mental health. Punishment/reward: The men got an exclusive tour of Mystic Aquarium and enjoyed an Italian lunch at Trattoria Amalfi with Ramsay. The women had to clean and prep the kitchen for the night's service. Cara Marie's spring allergies disrupted a lot of their cleaning. Service: Rapper Fat Joe and restaurateur Dara Mirjahangiry dined at the blue and red chef's tables respectively. Bradley initially had some issues with cooking fish and burns himself, but bounced back. Paul and Antonio have several problems timing the meat station and communicating with their teammates, especially Anthony. Elaina struggled with remembering Ramsay's instructions on how to cook salmon. Alexandra annoyed Ramsay by giggling and making snarky comments at her teammates. Ramsay kicked the men out after Paul gave him a raw lamb despite cooking for over 20 minutes. He then kicked the women out after Cat brought him an overcooked wellington. Elimination: For the women, Anaiya nominated Elaina for her performance on fish, and Alexandra for her performance on meat and overall behavior. For the men, Chris nominated Paul for his poor communication and timing on the meat station and Antonio for also failing on the meat station. Ramsay eliminated Paul his poor performance, and then sent both Alexandra and Antonio back in line, finally he also eliminated Elaina for being too inexperienced and uncoordinated on the salmon. As Elaina left, Alexandra gave Elaina the middle finger for her comments about her during their nominations, shocking her teammates. Ramsay's comment: "Here's the story of Elaina and Paul. They couldn't cook their proteins at all. They fell on the fish and meat and led their teams to defeat and now their jackets will hang on my wall."
366	4	"There's Something Fishy Going On"	October 16, 2025	HK-2404	1.59
Team Challenge: The teams are brought to a harbor to compete in a fish-themed cooking challenge. First they had a relay race where each team member had to go into a pile of fish and find the seven they had to cook. The red team beat the blue team and received a five-minute head start on cooking the fish. The red team chose Cat's sea bass over Ellie's. Restaurant owner Jeremy Sewall judged the dishes. Cat scored on sea bass, Chris and Jada scored on monkfish, Jon scored on bluefish, Lisa scored on John Dory, Alexandra and Henry scored on bream, Antonio scored on flounder, and Anthony scored on mackerel. The men won five-four. Punishment/reward: Anaiya used her punishment pass, trading places with Antonio. She and the men got to go on an overnight trip to Newport, Rhode Island, where they toured Green Veil Vineyards and spent the night in a private mansion with a prepared fancy dinner. Antonio and the women had to stay at the port to clean the boat they used for the fish challenge. Service: NFL players Tiki Barber sat at the red team's chef's table and Jordan Mailata dined at the blue team's chef's table. Cara Marie briefly slowed the red kitchen down during apps while serving tableside. Bradley had a miscommunication on wellingtons and didn't put them in, getting into a brief spat with Anthony over it. Alex didn't talk as much due to her previous conflicts with her teammates. Chris overcooked the salmon, but bounces back. Cat messed up on garnishes three times in a row by undercooking and under seasoning her carrots. Despite the mistakes, both teams complete service for the first time. The men were declared the winners, and the women had to nominate three chefs for elimination. Elimination: Ellie nominated Cat, Alexandra, and Cara Marie. Ramsay sent both Alexandra and Cara Marie back in line and eliminated Cat for her failures on garnish station. Ramsay then asks Bradley to stay behind to discuss his mistakes on the meat station after dismissing the rest of the chefs back to their dorms, ending the episode on a cliffhanger. Ramsay gave no comment on Cat's elimination, and Cat did not receive the burning picture sequence.
367	5	"A State of Confusion"	October 23, 2025	HK-2405	1.71
In the recap, Cat's jacket was hung and her picture was burnt. Following where the previous episode left off, Ramsay encouraged Bradley to be more open in his communication, warning him he won't be there long if he doesn't speak up. Team Challenge: Chefs from each team would face head to head to create dishes using a protein from one state combined with ingredients from another one. Ellie scored on her Colorado lamb with California almonds after Jayden dropped and broke his dish on the way to the pass, Anthony scored on Maine lobster and Washington apples, Lisa scored on Alabama quail with Minnesota morels, Jada and Bradley scored on Hawaiian mahi mahi and Georgia peaches, Cydni and Jon scored on Maryland soft shell crab and New Mexico chilis, Alexandra and Henry scored on Wyoming bison and Wisconsin cheese, and Antonio and Anaiya scored on Alaskan salmon and Idaho potatoes. The women won six-five. Punishment/reward: The women spent the day cruising in ATVs and had a BBQ lunch while the men made curry sauce for the halibut dish from scratch which included cracking coconuts. Service: UConn Huskies women's basketball players Paige Bueckers and Azzi Fudd sat at the blue team's chef's table, while their coach, Geno Auriemma, was at the red team's chef's table. Prior to the service, Alexandra messed up preparing the polenta for both teams, leading Cydni to take over for her. Anthony and Jayden struggled with communicating during appetizers. Alexandra overcooked her flatbreads and put too much garlic in the risotto, but bounced back. Despite Bradley's attempts to step up, he gets flustered and messes up garnishes several times. Ellie and Anaiya do well on meat despite their contrasting personalities. The women were declared the winners. Elimination: Jon nominated Bradley for his failures on garnish and Anthony for not communicating on apps, with Jayden also being considered due to his mistakes on fish station. Ramsay summoned all three up. Ramsay sent Anthony back in line after hearing his pleas and then eliminated Bradley for consistently getting overwhelmed at services. Ramsay's comment: "After another poor performance from the chef from the Bayou, the only thing left to say to Bradley is good-bye you."
368	6	"Hell's Chicken"	October 30, 2025	HK-2406	1.95
Team Challenge: The chefs had to create their own fried chicken dishes and were judged by Church's Texas Chicken CEO Joe Guith. While it wasn't shown, the red team chose to drop Cydni's dish from judging. The women won 17-16. Punishment/reward: For winning the challenge, the women received an all-expenses-paid trip to Atlanta to collaborate with Church's innovation team. For the day's reward, they went ziplining and enjoyed a steak and oyster lunch at Foxwoods. The men had to prepare airline chicken for that night's service. Service: Cake Boss host Buddy Valastro and his kids sat at the blue team's chef's table, while Teresa Giudice of The Real Housewives of New Jersey fame sat at the red team's chef's table. Jon takes the lead on fish station as Antonio plays a more supporting role and doesn't communicate as much. He initially overcooks and undercooks the scallops and overcooks the salmon before bouncing back. Lisa initially struggles on timing with garnish but corrects herself. With the service being on even pace, Ramsay challenges the team that gets their final orders done first the winner. Due to Jayden bringing out his wellingtons early, the women end up getting out first and win service. Elimination: Henry nominated Jon for his struggles on fish station and Antonio for not stepping up to help Jon and his lack of communication. Ramsay eliminated Antonio for lacking leadership qualities. He then called Jada up, and transferred her to the blue team to even the numbers. Ramsay's comment: "If silence were golden, Antonio would be a wealthy man. Unfortunately at Hell's Kitchen, it doesn't pay to be quiet."
369	7	"Guac a mole in Hell's Kitchen"	November 6, 2025	HK-2407	1.61
Team Challenge: Chefs from each team would face head-to-head to create Mexican dishes after one of them selects their ingredients in a Whac-A-Mole game, and were judged by acclaimed Mexican chef and restaurant owner Gabriela Cámara. Jon scored on pork tenderloin, Alexandra and Henry scored on red prawn, Anaiya scored on red snapper, Cara Marie and Anthony scored on flat iron steak, Jayden scored on chicken thighs, and Jada scored on skirt steak. The blue team won five-three. Punishment/reward: For winning the challenge, the blue team enjoyed a pool party with spa treatments and a Mexican lunch. The red team had to prepare tortillas by hand for the night's service. Service: Jayden initially overcooks his lobsters but quickly corrects it. With Cydni and Lisa struggling on scallops and pork chops as well as Anaiya overcooking meat, Ramsay briefly sends Jada in there to motivate them. Jon makes several mistakes with fries over the course of the night. Henry undercooks a pork chop order but bounces back. Chris overcooks a steak but quickly makes a new one. Ramsay kicks the red team out when Alexandra serves unseasoned potatoes and rice and Anaiya brings up undercooked meat. While blue team does complete service, Ramsay still declares both teams joint losers and asks them to nominate two chefs. Elimination: Cara Marie nominates Alexandra for under seasoning garnishes and Cydni for her issues on scallops and pork chops. Anthony nominates Jon for his issues with fries and Henry for his mistakes with pork chops. Ramsay sent Henry back in line and eliminated Jon for his two consecutive bad services in a row and failures on garnish station. Ramsay's comment: "Jon may be from the Peach State, but there was nothing peachy about his performance tonight."
370	8	"Cook for Your Life"	November 13, 2025	HK-2408	1.58
Team Challenge: Chefs would have to decode ingredients from scrambled license plates and determine whether they wanted to keep the ingredients for their dishes or give to the opposite team. They then had to choose to cook their ingredients from one of three proteins. The red team chose to drop Lisa's dish from judging. Alexandra, Cara Marie, Anthony, and Chris scored on Atlantic cod, Henry, Cydni, and Ellie scored on pork chop, and Jada scored on lamb. Anaiya and Jayden were the only chefs not to score. With the score tied four-four, Ramsay declares the blue team the winners as Henry had the best dish overall. When tasting Lisa's dish, he found the red team would have won if they included her dish over Anaiya's. Punishment/reward: Both teams were then sent to the Lake of Isles Golf Club at Foxwoods Resort. But while the blue team received a brand new Oxo cookware set and got to enjoy the afternoon at the resort's private driving range, the red team had to wash the resort's golf carts and pick up balls by hand on the range. Cook For Your Life (CFYL) challenge: The four chefs with the lowest scores overall in the season's challenges, Cara Marie, Chris, Ellie, and Jayden, had to cook for their lives in the competition. They had 45 minutes to cook a fish entrée. Chris, Ellie, and Jayden survived. Elimination: Ramsay eliminated Cara Marie due to the potato puree that came with her dish having a gummy texture as a result of her using a blender to make it. However, she was praised for her talent in cooking meats despite being a vegan chef and given encouragement. Ramsay's comment: "Even as a vegan chef, Cara Marie could cook proteins beautifully. Ironically, tonight it was the vegetables that did her in."
371	9	"Hell Hath No Fury Like Anaiya Scorned"	November 20, 2025	HK-2409	1.66
Team Challenge: With the next service being hosted for the 50th anniversary of Johnson & Wales University's culinary school, the chefs had to create dishes for the menu that would be served at the event. Jayden scored on scallops, Anaiya scored on squid, Jada scored on monkfish, Anthony scored on duck, and Henry scored on filet mignon. The blue team won four-one. Punishment/reward: The blue team went on a getaway to Cape Cod where they went parasailing and enjoyed a seafood lunch. The red team had to clean up the dorms and prepare cakes for the event. During the latter part, the red team grew increasingly annoyed with Anaiya's loud and arrogant demeanor. Service: In addition to some of the top representatives of Johnson & Wales attending the event, Hell's Kitchen season three winner Rock Harper, who is a university alumni, was also at the VIP table. Both teams heavily struggled with scallops and fish, with Alexandra and Chris getting multiple scallop plates sent back. Anaiya sent up an undercooked lobster but bounced back. Ellie and Jada experienced miscommunication issues with Ramsay. Anaiya took over the fish station and pushed Alex aside, giving her little to do. Despite both teams completing service, Ramsay was wholly unsatisfied with their performances; consequently, Ramsay once again declared both teams joint losers, and asked both teams to nominate two chefs for elimination. Elimination: Jada nominated Chris for his failures on fish station and Jayden for being one of the weaker chefs on their team. Cydni nominated Alexandra and Anaiya for their scallops and lobster getting sent back. While Alexandra did bring attention to Anaiya's behavior contributing to a toxic environment for the red team and her teammates agreed with her, Ramsay sent both Jayden and Anaiya back in line and chose to eliminate Alex based on her poor track record in services, but praised her passion and efforts. Ramsay then warned the red team that he did not want to hear any more reports about toxic environment amongst the team ever again. Ramsay's comment: "I never want to see the competition spirit turning into something negative, so I admire Alexandra for having a voice against bullying. I just wish her ability in the kitchen had been equally strong."
372	10	"Is It Steak?"	December 4, 2025	HK-2410	N/A
Team Challenge: The challenge was this season's edition of the Blind Taste Test. If a chef missed two or more items, steak sauces would be dumped on their teammates. Lisa scored two points while Chris didn't get any, Cydni scored two while Jada scored one, Anaiya scored three while Anthony scored two, Ellie scored zero while Jayden scored one, and Lisa scored one while Henry scored one. The final score was eight to five, with the red team winning. Punishment/reward: Chris used his punishment pass, trading places with Ellie. He and the women got to go jet skiing. Ellie and the blue team had to clean up the mess caused by the challenge. Service: Jordin Sparks, who previously attended season 17's opening service, returned as a chef's table guest in the red kitchen once again, this time with her husband Dana, while photographer Nigel Barker and his son Jack sat in the blue kitchen. Henry undercooked a plate of risotto, but bounced back. Cydni had a slow start before getting up to speed with some help. Chris proved to be disorganized throughout the night, being inconsistent on times and cooking with various meats, and held his team back on several plates. The red team had their best dinner performance yet with little to no issues and helped the blue team complete service. Elimination: Ramsay praised the red team for their performance and sent them back to the dorm to celebrate. He then eliminated Chris without nomination due to his downward spiral in recent services, but praised him for his optimism, and he received a retrospective montage. Ramsay's comment: "As a culinary instructor, Chris brings out the best in others, but tonight's service didn't bring out the best in him. I hope he finds his footing in New Jersey and keeps inspiring others."
373	11	"Charity Dinner from Hell"	December 11, 2025	HK-2411	N/A
Team Challenge: Both teams had to come up with their own menus featuring Chinese cuisine that would be judged by Buddha Lo. While cooking the dishes, teams would be split into pairs of two and alternate each with each other throughout the process. Jada scored on dumplings, Lisa scored on sweet and sour, Jayden and Anaiya scored on stir fry, and Ellie scored on noodles. The final score was three to two, with the red team winning. Punishment/reward: The red team were gifted Hexclad sets by Ramsay and toured the Mashantucket Pequot Museum. The blue team had to sort compost, recycling, and waste from dumpsters. Service: It was the charity night dinner service, with each chef overseeing one course each. The red team cooked for Feeding America and the blue team cooked for Stand Up to Cancer. In attendance for this service were JoJo Siwa, who was one of the Feeding America contributors, and Stand Up to Cancer co-founder Kathleen Lobb. Outside of the red team cooking half the scallops at once, Anaiya and Henry had minimal problems with the appetizer. Jayden was caught trying to cook capellini before the course begins. The blue team had a slow cook with the pasta on the capellini and Anthony miscounted the amount of plates when setting them up. Cydni accidentally put the fried rice in a pan. Jayden delayed sending out the duck when he doesn't let it rest and initially forgot the sauce to go with them. Jada had some timing issues with plating the filet mignon due to Jayden placing the vegetables in the wrong pan. The red team were declared the winners for being more in sync and getting their dishes out faster. Henry was named the Best of the Worst on the blue team and had to nominate two chefs for elimination. Elimination: Henry nominated Anthony and Jayden for having the shakiest courses of the night and not having good attention to detail. Ramsay eliminated Jayden for lacking leadership qualities and his mistakes that led to multiple nominations. Ramsay's comment: "Jayden was the first person in 24 seasons to drop a dish during a challenge. Then he dropped the ball during service, so I dropped him out of the competition."
374	12	"Battle for Black Jackets"	January 1, 2026	HK-2412	N/A
Former WWE champions emerge from the Hell's Kitchen final two doors whenever Ramsay mentions the word "champion" starting with Big E then Liv Morgan and their talk about what skills they use to become a champion leads to the last former WWE champion being introduced, Braun Strowman who also wears a familiar jacket that's worn by a Hell's Kitchen champion which in turn surprises the chefs on very special milestone as they get ready to rumble for a spot in a special group of five in black jackets. Black Jacket Challenge 1: Presented by Big E, Morgan, and Strowman, each chef had 45 minutes to create a dish that represents their state. Ellie received the first black jacket, followed by Jada after Ramsay tasted hers and Lisa's dish respective dishes. Black Jacket Challenge 2: The five remaining chefs put Connecticut on the map with making pizza in 30 minutes. Cydni received the third black jacket, with Lisa receiving the fourth. Black Jacket Challenge 3: Henry, Anaiya, and Anthony utilize their imagination by using the same ingredients that each spell "America" consisting of apple, mustard green, elk tenderloin, rhubarb, Idaho potato, Crown Royal and almonds. Despite Ramsay praising all three dishes, Henry was eliminated first and Anaiya received the final black jacket, marking the first time in the show's history where all the black jacket winners were women. Ramsay gave no comment on Henry's nor Anthony's elimination. But the latter did receive the full coat hook/burning picture sequence at the end of the opening recap montage in the next episode.
375	13	"Queens of the Kitchen"	January 8, 2026	HK-2413	N/A
Challenge: The chefs had to create a visually stunning and delicious dish that would be judged by Toro Boston owner Ken Oringer, Ramsay, and Ramsay's social media followers. Lisa won with her crispy skin black cod and chose Ellie to join her on the reward. Punishment/reward: Lisa and Ellie won various spices and a gift card from Spiceology before driving racing cars on a track and dining at Hell's Kitchen at Foxwoods Resort and Casino. The remaining chefs had to prepare a hundred pounds of French fries for that night's service. Service: Big E was a guest at the chef's table for the first black jacket service. Cydni gets flustered at fish station and misses one of the scallops for a dish. Anaiya undercooks lamb before bouncing back. She then has off timing with the other stations on entree before serving overcooked steak for the chef's table. Otherwise, the rest of the service has minimal issues. Elimination: Though the black jacket team initially did not come to a consensus on who to nominate, they ultimately settled on Cydni for issues with communication on fish station and Anaiya for her mistakes on meat. Ramsay eliminated Anaiya for making the most mistakes during service, and she received a retrospective montage. Ramsay's comment: "Delaware might be known as the first state, but unfortunately, after tonight's service, Anaiya will be known as fifth place."
376	14	"Who's the Boss"	January 8, 2026	HK-2414	N/A
Challenge: The chefs had ten minutes to get $25 worth of groceries at a market to make for their dishes. When they got back, Ramsay revealed each chef would be working with another chef's ingredients. Chef and restauranter Stephanie Izard judged their dishes. Ellie won with her shrimp and grits dish from Lisa's basket and chose Cydni to join her on the reward. Punishment/reward: Ellie and Cydni got to go on a $1,000 shopping spree to Kitch and enjoyed a seafood spread at S&P Oyster Bar with Michelle. Jada and Lisa had to clean the grease off pans and racks in the kitchen. Service: The final four chefs took turns running the pass, with planned sabotages by Ramsay. Jada caught all three of her sabotages. Lisa cooks the lobster too early before Cydni gets done with the risotto for one delivery. Cydni misses Ramsay replacing the salmon with ocean trout, but catches the next two sabotages. Lisa catches her first sabotage, but fails to catch Ramsay replacing peas with edamame and a strip steak with a ribeye. She also has difficulty communicating times with the other chefs. Ellie fails to read the flawed ticket Marino sent her, but catches the other two sabotages. The black jacket chefs once again had minimal issues. Elimination: Ramsay asked the final four chefs why they should advance to the finals. Ramsay chose Cydni, Jada and finally Ellie to advance to the finals, eliminating Lisa for not being as strong at the pass as the others. Ramsay allowed Lisa to keep her jacket and she received a retrospective montage. Ramsay's comment: "Lisa's cooking shined as bright as the Golden State. But to win the gold medal in this competition, you need to show true leadership skill, and not just culinary talent."
377	15	"Hell of a Showdown"	January 15, 2026	HK-2415	N/A
The final three are tasked with developing their own menus with an assigned sous chef. Jada was paired with James, Cydni was paired with Michelle, and Ellie was paired with guest chef Kesha Tatro.The chefs met their families and friends afterwards and had brunch with Ramsay. They were given fancy dresses and makeup to seemingly prepare for a press shoot, only to be greeted by a studio audience, the setting for their menu challenge. Individual challenge: The final three chefs had one hour to prepare a five-course menu, consisting of a cold and hot appetizer and a fish, chicken and beef entreé to be judged by Susan Feniger, Nina Compton, Ming Tsai, David Standridge, and Stephanie Izard. Jada, Cydni and Ellie received a 10, 8, and 9 in the first round; a 9, 8, and 8 in the second; an 8, 9, and 9 in the third; an 8, 8, and 9 in the fourth; and a 9, 9, and 9 in the final round. The final scores were 44, 42, and 44. Jada and Ellie advanced to the finale and Cydni was automatically eliminated. Jada got to pick her final brigade first for scoring the only 10. Brigade selection: Jada chose Anaiya, Anthony, Henry, and Chris. Ellie picked Cydni, Lisa, Jayden and was left with Alexandra. Ramsay did not comment on Cydni's elimination, she did not receive a portrait burning sequence, nor a retrospective montage.
378	16	"The Last State Standing Is..."	January 22, 2026	HK-2416	N/A
Jada and Ellie went through their final menus with their respective brigades. Ellie designs her menu around her steakhouse background and assigns Cydni to appetizers, Lisa to meat, Jayden to fish, and Alexandra to garnish. Jada's menu takes inspiration from several different cultures to give it a tropical feel and assigns Anthony to appetizers, Henry to meat, Anaiya to fish, and Chris to garnish. As they prepare for their final dinner service, Ellie's team is concerned about Alexandra as she struggles to make poached eggs while Jada closely monitors each station. Ramsay gave Ellie and Jada their head chef's jackets and an all-expenses paid trip after the finale, with three other people each, to the Great Wolf Lodge, a swimming park at Foxwoods. Service: During the appetizers, Jayden oversalted his mussels, but bounces back quickly by adding butter. Anaiya undercooks her scallops twice, and Jada encourages her not to rush them. During entrees, Lisa undercooks her first duck dish, but performs solidly the rest of the night. Both Alexandra and Chris struggle during the family dish on the garnish station, leading Jada to swap Chris with Anthony while Alexandra bounces back. Anaiya continues to have issues with cooking fish throughout the night. Ellie pushes back against Ramsay when he claims one of Lisa's chickens is overcooked. After the initial hiccups, both kitchens finish strongly with minimal issues. Ramsay called Jada and Ellie into his office for the last time, praising them for their progress and representing their states well. Ellie's door opened, making her the 24th winner of Hell's Kitchen. Ellie thanked everybody in a victory speech, and Jada took her defeat graciously. Ramsay's comment: "Ellie's brilliant final dinner service tonight confirmed for me that she is the absolute right choice for my next head chef. She's decisive, confident, resilient, and she has proven that she can overcome obstacles. She is a natural-born leader. The state of Nevada should be very proud of their representative. Ellie is going to be invaluable as my next head chef here at Hell's Kitchen Foxwoods Resort and Casino."
