= Hell's Kitchen (American TV series) =

American reality cooking show hosted by Gordon Ramsay

- Genre: Reality competition
- Created by: Gordon Ramsay
- Directed by: Brad Kreisberg (seasons 2–5); Sharon Trojan Hollinger (seasons 6–24); Kent Weed (season 25)
- Presented by: Gordon Ramsay
- Narrated by: Jason Thompson; Roger Craig Smith
- Opening theme: "Fire" by the Ohio Players (seasons 1–18)
- Composer: David Vanacore
- Country of origin: United States
- Original language: English
- No. of seasons: 25
- No. of episodes: 386 (list of episodes)

Production
- Executive producers: Arthur Smith; Kent Weed; Gordon Ramsay; Kenny Rosen; David Eilenberg; Bernie Schaeffer
- Production locations: California (seasons 1–18; 21–22); Nevada (seasons 19–20); Connecticut (seasons 23–present)
- Running time: 41–44 minutes
- Production companies: A. Smith & Co. Productions; Granada America (season 1–5); ITV Studios (seasons 6–9; 19–20); ITV Studios America (seasons 9–12); ITV Studios Global Entertainment (seasons 13–16); ITV Entertainment (seasons 17–18); ITV America (season 21–present)

Original release
- Network: Fox
- Release: May 30, 2005 – present

Related
- Hell's Kitchen (British TV series)

Hell's Kitchen is an American reality competition cooking show that premiered on Fox on May 30, 2005. The series is hosted by celebrity chef Gordon Ramsay, who created and appeared in the British series of the same name. Each season, two teams of chefs compete for a job as head chef at a restaurant, while working in the kitchen of a restaurant set up in the television studio.

A progressive elimination format reduces a field of 12 to 20 contestants down to a single winner over the course of each season. In a typical episode, two contestants are nominated for elimination, with Ramsay then eliminating one of the nominees chosen (two at some points). The series notably features Ramsay's explosive anger towards contestants, which in reality is heavily dramatized for the benefit of the audience. Hell's Kitchen has been nominated for six Primetime Emmy Awards. A chain of Gordon Ramsay Hell's Kitchen restaurants have been opened, inspired by the show.

The twenty-fifth season of Hell's Kitchen premiered in September 2026.

== Format ==
Hell's Kitchen is a reality television show that uses a progressive elimination format to narrow down a field of 12 to 20 chefs to one single winner over the course of one season. The American version of Hell's Kitchen follows the same format of the British version, although the show is aired on tape delay and not performed live, nor is there audience participation in the elimination of chefs, who are also not celebrities as they are in the British version. The show was initially produced at Hell's Kitchen, a modified warehouse in Los Angeles that included the restaurant, dual kitchen facilities, and a dormitory where the chefs resided while on the show. They are also given knife sets that they get to keep, regardless of their progress.

At the start of each season, Gordon Ramsay breaks the chefs into two teams. With the exception of the first, 18th, and 21st seasons, this puts women on the red team and men on the blue team; each is given a chef's jacket with panels of that color on the shoulders (from Seasons 1–18, 24–present) or around their collar (Seasons 19–23). The chefs remain on these teams throughout most of the competition, but Ramsay may reassign a chef to the other team if the team numbers are uneven, wishes to experiment, or if he feels the chef will perform better on the other team. Each episode typically includes a challenge and a dinner service, followed by the elimination of a chef, or, under rare circumstances, multiple. When only five or six chefs remain, they are brought into a single common team wearing black-paneled jackets. From this point onward, they compete individually during challenges and work together during services to be one of the final two.

The show's first two seasons allowed contestants from any professional background (such as marketing executives or similar white-collar positions) to apply for the show and compete. This almost always resulted in most contestants who did not come from a culinary-related background getting eliminated early on, while contestants familiar with the industry usually lasted considerably longer. Therefore, a requirement that every contestant have some form of culinary background was adopted, starting from season 3.

=== Challenges ===
Challenges are issued during the team and individual stages of the competition. The type of challenges are varied, and may include culinary skill tests and themed cooking challenges. The first challenge of each season has been a signature dish cook-off, giving the chefs a chance to show Ramsay their creativity and individuality. Starting from season 6, the signature dish cook-off has also been the first team challenge, with rewards and punishments on the line.

Some of the challenges which have featured across multiple seasons include:

- Preparing certain ingredients, dishes or styles of cuisine.
- "Taste It, Now Make It", in which chefs must recreate a dish Ramsay has prepared based on taste and appearance.
- "Blind Taste Test", in which chefs must identify ingredients while blindfolded and wearing noise-cancelling headphones.
- Breakfast or lunch services, in which the first team to complete the service is the winner.
- Creating menu items for special services in Hell's Kitchen, in which the winning team is the one with more dishes chosen.
- "Black Jacket Challenges", in which competitors attempt to earn the right to wear a black jacket and advance to the individual phase of the competition.

Challenge winners are determined through scoring systems set for that challenge, or at the discretion of Chef Ramsay and any guest judges.

==== Rewards ====
The winning team or chef will receive a reward (which is usually a recreational activity away from Hell's Kitchen, and potentially other prizes). In the case of some individual challenges, winning chefs may also earn advantages or privileges in the competition, such as immunity from elimination for that service, or having their dish added to the Hell's Kitchen menu as a special item.

Starting from Season 18, Ramsay would hold an individual challenge early in the competition for a special item called the "Punishment Pass". The current iteration of this item allows its holder to choose a member of their opposing team to swap places with, should their own team lose a challenge. Ramsay originally issued one pass to the challenge's top competitor, and currently issues two passes (one for each top competitor on their respective teams). Punishment Passes may be used at any time following a team challenge, and expire during the Black Jacket phase of the competition.

==== Punishments ====
The losing team or chef will have to do menial tasks, such as cleaning the kitchens or dormitories, preparing ingredients for service for the winning team's kitchen (as well as their own), or even doing unsavory tasks such as clearing garbage or eating foul items for their lunch.

From Season 19 to Season 21, and in Seasons 23 and 24, the Punishment Pass individual challenge was also a high-stakes elimination challenge, with the worst-performing chefs potentially getting eliminated before the first dinner service. In Season 21, the contestant with the worst dish (Ileana D'Silva) was able to convince Chef Ramsay to give her another chance, allowing her to stay longer. In Season 23, no contestants were eliminated this way, due to the quality of all the dishes presented.

=== Dinner Services ===
For dinner services, contestants are organized based on a typical French brigade, and are expected to work specific stations (appetizers, meat, fish, or garnish) on the kitchen line. They must coordinate with their teammates to prepare food according to Ramsay's high standards for quality and presentation. At the start of the season, Ramsay and the sous chefs will issue recipe books to the contestants, and they are expected to study the dishes and memorize the steps to preparing them. Menus are subject to change across multiple seasons and even across multiple services in the same season, although some dishes like seared scallops, risotto, rack of lamb, and Beef Wellington have been staples of the Hell's Kitchen menu.

Dinner services are for about 100 covers, which include volunteers and special guests (such as celebrities). Each guest expects to receive a three-course meal, consisting of an appetizer, an entree, and a dessert. Before each dinner service, Chef Ramsay will assemble both teams in the kitchen to encourage them, as well as go through the agenda for the night's service. Besides being in the kitchen, contestants have also been assigned to other roles during service, such as serving tableside appetizers, or working as servers. While dividing his attention between the red and blue kitchens, Chef Ramsay is assisted by two trusted sous-chefs (one in each kitchen), who monitor the team in his absence and demand the same standards, alerting Ramsay of any issues that crop up.

Menus may be customized for a specific dinner service, such as ethnic-themed dishes or plates that resulted from the earlier challenge. Some seasons feature a service allowing for the teams to develop their own menus, which are reviewed by Ramsay for quality and presentation beforehand. Later episodes may feature a private dinner service, where each team must serve a five course meal to 12 guests, with each member leading their teammates to prepare one course. Dinner services may include additional challenges. A chef from each team may be asked to serve a table-side meal for their team, serve celebrities sitting at the kitchen's chef's table, or act as a server for the evening taking and fulfilling orders. After the chefs are on a single black team, the last dinner service before the finale usually has each chef run the pass as a test of their quality control, including deliberate mistakes made by the sous-chefs or Ramsay himself.

During a service, Ramsay demands that all orders for each course for a table go out together, and will send back entire orders if one item is improperly prepared, such as being over- or undercooked or not seasoned correctly, although he may send out incomplete orders to urge the chefs to get it together. While the chefs are in two teams, Ramsay is assisted by two trusted sous-chefs, each monitoring one of the kitchens, demanding the same standards and alerting Ramsay to any issues. Ramsay's goal is to complete every dinner service, but exceptionally poor kitchen performance by one or both teams will cause him to close their respective halves of the kitchen early and send them back to the dorms, thus ending the dinner service immediately (in the first three seasons, poor kitchen performance resulted in the restaurant being shut down and customers leaving hungry; season 4 onward resulted in chefs being eliminated early and a professional cast of chefs finishing the service instead after complaints of customers not being fed, forced a rule change). Ramsay may also evict individual chefs from the kitchen based on repeated poor performances during a service (though this has largely been phased out in newer seasons in order to encourage more team-based responsibility for mistakes), and on semi-rare occasions (once every two seasons on average), may eliminate a chef on the spot. Chefs may also walk out when under pressure from Ramsay, which more often than not will lead to their withdrawal from the show.

=== Elimination ===
Once the dinner service is complete, Ramsay gathers everyone in the kitchen, announces which team is the losing team and directs them to select one or two members of their team as nominees for elimination. It is possible that both teams are declared losers or a different number of chefs may be requested for nomination (usually three chefs in such cases). In some cases, Ramsay has named both teams winners but still requires them to each nominate someone for elimination. This is a group consensus, but Ramsay may occasionally name a chef "best of the worst" or "best of the best" on their team and instruct them to choose the nominees; this concept, however, has faded away over time due to the contestants sometimes making nominations based on personal bias rather than kitchen performance. Ramsay has also on some occasions declared that nobody would be sent home but those cases are generally accompanied by a double elimination the following service, a team reassignment or occur after someone has been sent home on the spot for insubordination or exceptionally poor performance.

Ramsay reassembles the teams in the dining hall and stands about ten feet away from the losing team, before choosing a random contestant on the team to announce the nominations. If there is a winning team, they will often congregate at a nearby table by Ramsay during the process. Once all nominations have been announced, Ramsay will beckon all nominated contestants (in addition, he can also void a nomination or nominate other chefs for elimination if he sees fit) from the losing team and ask each of them to explain why they should stay in Hell's Kitchen. After giving these nominees the chance to defend themselves, Ramsay selects one to hand over their jacket and "leave Hell's Kitchen." On rarer occasions, Ramsay can overrule nominations or even eliminate a chef who has not been nominated, which may even include a chef on a winning team.

The eliminated chef is subsequently shown leaving the restaurant through a hallway while providing some last thoughts on the experience (in cases where contestants are eliminated mid-service or otherwise leave the competition in a non-traditional manner, they will often head back to the dorms to retrieve their belongings before their last interview). After dismissing the chefs, Ramsay goes back upstairs to his office. He symbolically hangs the chef's jacket on a sharp hook below their picture in a row with the others, igniting their picture and signaling their departure (in the first season, he simply hung their jacket and the camera would zoom in on the eliminated chef's name). During this scene, there is a voice-over of Ramsay explaining his reasons for eliminating the chef; albeit humorously at times (in the first season, he simply addressed the show's progress on-camera to the viewers). If an eliminated chef has performed exceptionally well, Ramsay may allow them to keep their jacket as a token of their success up to that point, if he sees fit.

Chefs may be eliminated from the competition for medical reasons, both voluntarily and involuntarily. Chefs that violate the competition's rules may be immediately eliminated, mainly during dinner service. Chefs may also exit the competition voluntarily for any other reason; though this is not encouraged, their wishes are ultimately granted (with reasons by Ramsay explained, if applicable).

Once the original field is cut down to either five or six chefs (depending on what Ramsay wishes to do), they are awarded black jackets and assembled into a single team. In the most recent seasons, black jackets are awarded by a series of rigorous individual challenges rather than dinner service, with contestants not receiving black jackets being eliminated. Eliminations continue until the final two contestants are left. In some cases involving the final four contestants, a double elimination will occur to leave the final two. In season 17 and since season 19, a change in the show's format occurred where the final three chefs cooked dishes scored by 5 guest judges, with the chef with the lowest point total being eliminated.

=== Final service ===
In the finale, the final two chefs are each given the opportunity to develop their own menus and lead a brigade of former competitors through a full dinner service on their own. In the first five seasons, this included the opportunity to decorate half of the Hell's Kitchen restaurant to their liking. Prior to the dinner service, the two chefs compete in a challenge to prepare their menus, and the winner will earn the advantage of picking their brigade of chefs first. Ramsay will ensure that all menu items meet his standards for high cuisine prior to service, and he and his sous chefs will oversee the service to make sure that his high quality standards are retained, but does not otherwise get involved (as long as he feels the finalist is in control of their brigade), allowing the two remaining chefs to demonstrate their ability to run the line. The finalists are allowed to reassign stations, or even kick their teammates out of the kitchen should they see fit; the latter has happened four times in the show's history, including Ramsay himself kicking one of the brigade members out. On one occasion, a chef had walked out of service under their own accord.

Ramsay uses his own observations and those from the diners and other sources to decide who is the winning chef. He has two doors in his office leading out to the balcony above the Hell's Kitchen seating area. Each chef stands at a door and Ramsay tells them to both turn their handles at the same time. Only the door of the winning chef is unlocked, allowing the winner to walk through and be greeted by the crowd below. The winning chef is said to receive two prizes including the opportunity to work as the head chef or executive chef at a restaurant of Ramsay's choosing (with the exceptions of seasons 6 and 7, this has always been in the United States), as well as a cash prize of $250,000. In a similar manner to the voiceover at each elimination, Ramsay has a voiceover to explain his reasons for choosing that chef as the winner. In addition, the winner hangs a picture of themselves alongside the previous winners that is seen at the restaurant's front entrance.

In reality, the winning chef appears to only be guaranteed the cash portion of the prize and an offer to work somewhere within Gordon Ramsay's network of restaurants. Many winners were offered a lesser role than that of head chef at the restaurant billed in their season, while some appeared to take a role completely unrelated to the one described as that season's prize.

== Cast ==
Cast member	Season																								
Cast member	1	2	3	4	5	6	7	8	9	10	11	12	13	14	15	16	17	18	19	20	21	22	23	24	25
Executive Chef
Gordon Ramsay	Main	Main	Main	Main	Main	Main	Main	Main	Main	Main	Main	Main	Main	Main	Main	Main	Main	Main	Main	Main	Main	Main	Main	Main	Main
Sous Chefs
Blue Team
Scott Leibfried	Main (Note: Seasons 1–10)	Main	Main	Main	Main	Main	Main	Main	Main	Main															
James Avery											Main (Note: Seasons 11–14 & Seasons 23–25)	Main	Main	Main									Main	Main	Main
Aaron Mitrano															Main (Note: Seasons 15–16)	Main									
James "Jocky" Petrie																	Main (Note: Seasons 17–18)	Main							
Jason Santos							Contestant			Guest			Guest						Main (Note: Seasons 19–22)	Main	Main	Main			
Red Team
MaryAnn Salcedo	Main (Note: Seasons 1–3)	Main	Main																						
Gloria Felix				Main (Note: Seasons 4–5)	Main																				
Heather West		Contestant	Guest		Guest	Main (Note: Season 6)																			Guest
Andi Van Willigan-Cutspec							Main (Note: Seasons 7–14 & Season 16)	Main	Main	Main	Main	Main	Main	Main	Guest	Main									
Christina Wilson										Contestant	Guest	Guest	Guest	Guest	Main (Note: Season 15 & Seasons 17–22)	Guest	Main	Main	Main	Main	Main	Main			Guest
Michelle Tribble														Contestant			Contestant		Guest	Guest			Main (Note: Seasons 23–25)	Main	Main
Maître d'hôtel
Jean-Philippe Susilovic	Main	Main	Main	Main	Main	Main	Main				Main	Main													
James Lukanik								Main	Main	Main															
Marino Monferrato											Guest		Main	Main	Main	Main	Main	Main	Main	Main	Main	Main	Main	Main	Main

Gordon Ramsay is the head chef. Jason Thompson is the narrator. Jean-Philippe Susilovic, a Belgian maître d'hôtel, comes from Pétrus, one of Ramsay's London restaurants and appeared in the first seven seasons. Susilovic was also the maître d'hôtel for the first series of the original British version. James Lukanik replaced Susilovic for seasons eight, nine, and ten. Susilovic returned for seasons 11 and 12, before being replaced on a permanent basis by Marino Monferrato. During Season 21, Marino was away between episodes two and nine, Matthew Childs temporarily filled in for him as maître d'. Each team also has the services of one of two sous-chefs. Season 14 finalist and Season 17 winner Michelle Tribble is the current red team sous-chef, with James Avery returning as the current blue team sous-chef.

Previous sous-chefs were MaryAnn Salcedo, Gloria Felix, Season 2 winner Heather West, Andi Van Willigan-Cutspec, Scott Leibfried, Aaron Mitrano, Season 10 winner Christina Wilson, James "Jocky" Petrie and Season 7 runner-up Jason "Jay" Santos. In Season 15, Wilson filled in for Van Willigan-Cutspec (who was getting married at the time of filming but returned for one episode when her reception was one of the themed dinner services for that season). Van Willigan-Cutspec returned in Season 16 but was replaced by Wilson again for Seasons 17–22 for personal reasons.

== Production ==
=== Broadcasting ===
The theme song is "Fire" by the Ohio Players. When the American version is broadcast in the U.K., Italy, Portugal and some countries (shown on the table below), it features only the instrumental version. The instrumental version also appeared in the uncensored DVD release for the American version. Starting from season 17, the show changed the theme song to a short string medley. It also stopped featuring annual contestants in the opening sequence and simply reused a sequence of Ramsay in a tense, empty kitchen.

=== Setting ===
For the show's first two seasons, the Hell's Kitchen restaurant set itself was housed in the former studios of Los Angeles television station KCOP at 915 North La Brea Avenue, in Hollywood, which at one time hosted production of game shows Tic Tac Dough and The Joker's Wild. KCOP was acquired by News Corporation in 2001 and its studios were integrated with those of Fox affiliate KTTV in 2003, leaving the La Brea facility vacant. Originally the studio was put up for sale, but in the end they were retooled for the production of Hell's Kitchen. The dining room area was the location of the former KCOP news studios, and living quarters for the contestants were built behind the restaurant.

Before season three, the Hell's Kitchen facility was moved to 20th Century Studios at 3322 La Cienega Place in Los Angeles. From seasons 4–18, Hell's Kitchen's venue has been located at 8660 Hayden Place in Culver City. According to Arthur Perkins, the soundstage is only open for audience members when taping is taking place.

The first 18 seasons were produced in modified warehouses in Los Angeles which included the restaurant, dual kitchen facilities, and dormitories where the contestants resided while on the show. The nineteenth and twentieth seasons were filmed at the Caesars Entertainment Studios property near the Las Vegas Strip. Seasons 21 and 22 were shot back-to-back in Burbank, California, in what used to be an IKEA building. Seasons 23 and 24 were filmed at the Foxwoods Resort Casino in Mashantucket, Connecticut.

=== Accusations of staging ===
The series has drawn numerous online and editorial accusations of staging and dramatic license, mostly due to editing techniques of the producers, who splice together several hours of footage from a dinner service, in order to make certain contestants appear as poor performers, later justifying their elimination. This was most obvious when one episode featured clips showing Amanda "Tek" Moore, who was already eliminated, in the background, still cooking three episodes after her elimination.

== Series overview ==
Season	Original run	Winner	Runner-up	No. of contestants	Winner's prize
1	May 30 – August 1, 2005	Michael Wray	Ralph Pagano	12	Tatou in Los Angeles (Note: Season 1 winner Michael Wray was offered the alternative choice of working at Gordon Ramsay in London but declined the offer in order to be closer to his family.)
2	June 12 – August 14, 2006	Heather West	Virginia Dalbeck	12	Terra Rossa at Red Rock Resort Spa and Casino in Las Vegas
3	June 4 – August 13, 2007	Rock Harper	Bonnie Muirhead	12	Terra Verde at Green Valley Ranch in Henderson
4	April 1 – July 8, 2008	Christina Machamer	Louis Petrozza	15	London West Hollywood in Los Angeles
5	January 29 – May 14, 2009	Danny Veltri	Paula da Silva	16	Fornelletto at the Borgata in Atlantic City
6	July 21 – October 13, 2009	Dave Levey	Kevin Cottle	17	Araxi Restaurant and Bar in Whistler
7	June 1 – August 10, 2010	Holli Ugalde	Jason "Jay" Santos	16	Savoy Grill at Savoy Hotel in London (Note: Season 7 winner Holli Ugalde was refused a UK work permit and so was awarded the cash prize in lieu of the job at the Savoy Grill.)
8	September 22 – December 15, 2010	Nona Sivley	Russell Kook II	16	LA Market at JW Marriott Hotel in Los Angeles
9	July 18 – September 19, 2011	Paul Niedermann	Will Lustberg	18	BLT Steak in New York City
10	June 4 – September 10, 2012	Christina Wilson	Justin Antiorio	18	Gordon Ramsay Steak in the Paris Las Vegas
11	March 12 – July 25, 2013	Ja'Nel Witt	Mary Poehnelt	20	Gordon Ramsay Pub & Grill at Caesars Palace (Note: Season 11 winner Ja'Nel Witt's job offer was withdrawn after she failed a drug test, but she kept the cash prize. Due to a commitment on Witt's job withdrawal, season 12 winner Scott Commings later won the job offer after winning in the next season.)
12	March 13 – July 24, 2014	Scott Commings	Jason Zepaltas (Note: Originally competed on season 9 but left before first dinner service due to illness.)	20	Gordon Ramsay Pub & Grill at Caesars Palace
13	September 10 – December 17, 2014	La Tasha McCutchen	Bryant Gallaher	18	Gordon Ramsay Pub & Grill at Caesars Atlantic City (Note: Season 13 winner La Tasha McCutchen and Season 14 winner Meghan Gill shared head chef duties at Caesars Atlantic City.)
14	March 3 – June 9, 2015	Meghan Gill	Torrece "T" Gregoire	18	Gordon Ramsay Pub & Grill at Caesars Atlantic City
15	January 15 – April 29, 2016	Ariel Malone	Kristin Barone	18	BLT Steak at Bally's Las Vegas
16	September 23, 2016 – February 2, 2017	Kimberly-Ann Ryan	Heather Williams	18	Yardbird Southern Table & Bar at The Venetian Las Vegas
17	September 29, 2017 – February 2, 2018	Michelle Tribble (Note: Originally competed on season 14, finishing third.)	Benjamin Knack (Note: Originally competed on season 7, finishing third.)	16	Hell's Kitchen Restaurant at Caesars Palace (Note: Season 18 winner Ariel Contreras-Fox declined the position at Gordon Ramsay Hell's Kitchen in Las Vegas, preferring not to move her family from the East Coast, but agreed to participate at various of Ramsay's special events (such as the 1-year anniversary celebration of the prize restaurant).)
18	September 28, 2018 – February 8, 2019	Ariel Contreras-Fox (Note: Originally competed on season 6, finishing third.)	Mia Castro	16	Hell's Kitchen Restaurant at Caesars Palace
19	January 7 – April 22, 2021	Kori Sutton	Mary Lou Davis	18	Hell's Kitchen Restaurant at Lake Tahoe (Note: Season 19 winner Kori Sutton declined the position at Gordon Ramsay Hell's Kitchen in Lake Tahoe for family reasons.)
20	May 31 – September 13, 2021	Trenton Garvey	Megan Gill	18	Gordon Ramsay Steak in the Paris Las Vegas
21	September 29, 2022 – February 9, 2023	Alex Belew	Dafne Mejia	18	Hell's Kitchen Restaurant at Caesars Atlantic City
22	September 28, 2023 – January 25, 2024	Ryan O'Sullivan	Johnathan Benvenuti	18	Hell's Kitchen Restaurant at Caesars Palace
23	September 26, 2024 – February 6, 2025	Kyle Timpson	Hannah Flora	18	Hell's Kitchen Restaurant at Foxwoods Resort Casino
24	September 25, 2025 – January 22, 2026	Ellie Parker	Jada Vidal	20	Hell's Kitchen Restaurant at Foxwoods Resort Casino
25	September 24, 2026 — TBA	TBA	TBA	18	Hell's Kitchen Restaurant at Foxwoods Resort Casino

== Reception ==
=== Awards and nominations ===
Hell's Kitchen has been nominated for three Primetime Emmy Awards in the Outstanding Art Direction for Variety, Music or Nonfiction Programming category in 2007, 2008, and 2009. It has also been nominated for two Art Directors Guild Awards in the Television — Awards Show, Variety, Music or Non-Fiction Program category in 2007 and 2008, winning one in 2008. It has also been nominated for a Teen Choice Award for Choice Summer Series.

In 2009, Gordon Ramsay won an Astra Award for Favourite International Personality or Actor.

At the 2011 People's Choice Awards, Hell's Kitchen was nominated for Favorite Reality Show and Gordon Ramsay was nominated for Favorite TV Chef.

At the 2014 Reality TV Awards ceremony, Hell's Kitchen won an award for best new cast. In 2015, Hell's Kitchen won awards for best overall show and guilty pleasure at the 2015 Reality TV Awards.

=== U.S. Nielsen ratings ===
Season	Season premiere		Season finale		TV season	Time slot (ET/PT)	Rank	Viewers (in millions)
Season	Date	Viewers (in millions)	Date	Viewers (in millions)	TV season	Time slot (ET/PT)	Rank	Viewers (in millions)
1	May 30, 2005	6.80	August 1, 2005	8.94	2005	Monday 9:00 p.m.		7.04
2	June 12, 2006	5.90	August 14, 2006	9.55	2006	Monday 9:00 p.m.		7.56
3	June 4, 2007	8.16	August 13, 2007	9.68	2007	Monday 9:00 p.m.		8.36
4	April 1, 2008	11.85	July 8, 2008	8.91	2007–08	Tuesday 9:00 p.m.		10.06
5	January 29, 2009	10.86	May 14, 2009	7.37	2008–09	Thursday 9:00 p.m.		8.01
6	July 21, 2009	6.09	October 13, 2009	8.04	2009	Tuesday 8:00 p.m.		7.23
7	June 1, 2010	6.22	August 10, 2010	7.24	2010	Tuesday 8:00 p.m.		6.51
8	September 22, 2010	5.98	December 15, 2010	5.86	2010–11	Wednesday 8:00 p.m. (1–10); Wednesday 9:00 p.m. (11–15)		6.15
9	July 18, 2011	5.84	September 19, 2011	5.94	2011	Monday 8:00 p.m. (1, 3, 5, 7, 9–11, 15–16); Monday 9:00 p.m. (12–14)		6.11
9	July 18, 2011	5.84	September 19, 2011	5.94	2011	Tuesday 8:00 p.m. (2, 4, 6, 8)		6.13
10	June 4, 2012	5.46	September 10, 2012	6.27	2012	Monday 8:00 p.m. (1, 3, 5, 7, 9, 11, 12, 14, 20); Monday 9:00 p.m. (16–18)		6.13
10	June 4, 2012	5.46	September 10, 2012	6.27	2012	Tuesday 8:00 p.m. (2, 4, 6, 8, 10, 13, 15, 19)		5.60
11	March 12, 2013	5.30	July 25, 2013	5.61	2012–13	Tuesday 8:00 p.m. (1–10); Monday 8:00 p.m. (11–12); Thursday 8:00 p.m. (13–18, 21–22); Thursday 9:00 p.m. (19–20)		5.08
12	March 13, 2014	5.45	July 24, 2014	5.17	2013–14	Thursday 8:00 p.m.		4.83
13	September 10, 2014	4.27	December 17, 2014	3.60	2014–15	Wednesday 8:00 p.m.		3.77
14	March 3, 2015	4.09	June 9, 2015	3.42	2014–15	Tuesday 8:00 p.m. (1–13); Tuesday 9:00 p.m. (14–16)		3.50
15	January 15, 2016	3.41	April 29, 2016	3.13	2015–16	Friday 9:00 p.m. (1–2, 12–16); Wednesday 9:00 p.m. (3–11)		3.56
16	September 23, 2016	3.37	February 2, 2017	3.67	2016–17	Friday 8:00 p.m. (1–10); Thursday 8:00 p.m. (11–16)		3.48
17	September 29, 2017	3.02	February 2, 2018	3.36	2017–18	Friday 8:00 p.m.		3.13
18	September 28, 2018	2.98	February 8, 2019	3.17	2018–19	Friday 9:00 p.m.		2.78
19	January 7, 2021	2.78	April 22, 2021	2.93	2020–21	Thursday 8:00 p.m.		2.68
20	May 31, 2021	2.32	September 13, 2021	2.23	2021–22	Monday 8:00 p.m.		2.47
21	September 29, 2022	1.89	February 9, 2023	2.29	2022–23	Thursday 8:00 p.m.		2.07
22	September 28, 2023	1.77	January 25, 2024	2.00	2023–24	Thursday 8:00 p.m.		2.07
23	September 26, 2024	1.58	February 6, 2025	1.97	2024–25	Thursday 8:00 p.m.		1.69
24	September 25, 2025	1.43	January 22, 2026	TBD	2025–26	Thursday 8:00 p.m.	TBD	TBD

== Other media ==
=== Home media ===
Visual Entertainment (under license from ITV Studios) has released the first fourteen seasons of Hell's Kitchen on DVD in Region 1. Season 14 was released on March 15, 2016, and to the Blu-ray format for the first time.

In Region 4, Shock Entertainment has released seasons 1–8 on DVD in Australia.

DVD/BD title	No. of episodes	Release dates		
DVD/BD title	No. of episodes	Region 1 (CAN)	Region 1 (US)	Region 4 (AUS)
Hell's Kitchen – Season 1: Raw and Uncensored	10	April 8, 2008		December 1, 2008
Hell's Kitchen – Season 2: Raw and Uncensored	10	October 27, 2009	May 11, 2010	February 2, 2009
Hell's Kitchen – Season 3: Raw and Uncensored	11	August 10, 2010	September 21, 2010	February 2, 2009
Hell's Kitchen – Season 4: Raw and Uncensored	15	November 16, 2010	November 9, 2010	April 1, 2009
Hell's Kitchen – Season 5: Raw and Uncensored	15	August 30, 2011		November 27, 2009
Hell's Kitchen – Season 6: Raw and Uncensored	15	November 1, 2011	April 10, 2012	March 9, 2011
Hell's Kitchen – Season 7: Raw and Uncensored	15	June 5, 2012		May 11, 2011
Hell's Kitchen – Season 8: Raw and Uncensored	15	December 4, 2012		May 11, 2011
Hell's Kitchen – Season 9: Raw and Uncensored	16	August 27, 2013	September 10, 2013	TBA
Hell's Kitchen – Season 10: Raw and Uncensored	20	October 8, 2013	October 1, 2013	TBA
Hell's Kitchen – Season 11: Raw and Uncensored	22	April 15, 2014		TBA
Hell's Kitchen – Season 12: Raw and Uncensored	20	September 1, 2015		TBA
Hell's Kitchen – Season 13: Raw and Uncensored	16	November 24, 2015		TBA
Hell's Kitchen – Season 14: Raw and Uncensored	16	March 15, 2016		TBA

=== Video games ===
On September 11, 2008, Ubisoft released Hell's Kitchen: The Game for the Wii, Nintendo DS, Microsoft Windows, and iOS, which features the likeness of Ramsay, and the many important tasks shown in the American version of the show.

On April 2, 2009, Ludia and Social2u released the official Facebook version of the Hell's Kitchen video game.
