= Hell's Kitchen (American TV series) season 23 =

Season of television series

Hell's Kitchen: Head Chefs Only
- Season 23
- Promotional poster for season 23, featuring host Ramsay
- Hosted by: Gordon Ramsay
- No. of contestants: 18
- Winner: Kyle Timpson
- Runner-up: Hannah Flora
- No. of episodes: 16

Release
- Original network: Fox
- Original release: September 26, 2024 – February 6, 2025

Season chronology
- ← Previous; The American Dream Next → Battle of the States

The twenty-third season of the American competitive reality television series Hell's Kitchen (subtitled as Hell's Kitchen: Head Chefs Only) premiered on Fox on September 26, 2024, and concluded on February 6, 2025. Gordon Ramsay returned as host and head chef, while season 14 semifinalist and season 17 winner Michelle Tribble returned as the Red Team's sous-chef, replacing Christina Wilson, and season 11–14 sous-chef James Avery returned as the Blue Team's sous-chef, replacing Jason Santos. Marino Monferrato returned as maître d'. This was the first season to take place on the East Coast, with all episodes filmed at the Foxwoods Resort Casino in Ledyard, Connecticut, where the winner became head chef at the Hell's Kitchen Restaurant and also received $250,000.

The season was won by executive chef Kyle Timpson, with country club executive chef Hannah Flora finishing second.

This season aired the 350th episode of the series.

== Production ==
On March 26, 2024, it was announced that Hell's Kitchen was renewed for a twenty-third and twenty-fourth season, with the twenty-third season, subtitled Head Chefs Only, premiering on September 26, 2024.

== Chefs ==
Eighteen chefs competed in season 23, consisting of head chefs and executive chefs.

Contestant	Age	Occupation	Hometown	Result
Kyle Timpson	29	Executive chef	Dennis Township, New Jersey	Winner
Hannah Flora	31	Country club executive chef	DeKalb, Illinois	Runner-up
Egypt Davis	31	Executive banquet chef	Chicago, Illinois	Eliminated during finals
Whitney "Whit" Thomas	35	Head chef	Reidsville, North Carolina	Eliminated before finals
Brandon Kerr	34	Executive chef/restaurant co-owner	Lafayette, Indiana	Eliminated after tenth service
Amanda Currie	39	Executive chef	Orlando, Florida	Eliminated before Black Jackets
Joe Tartamella	35	Executive chef	Staten Island, New York	Eliminated after ninth service
Ann Marie Stauber	34	Executive chef	Highlands Ranch, Colorado	Eliminated after ninth service
Brittany Fanning	37	Executive chef	Homer, Alaska	Eliminated after eighth service
Lourdes "Lulu" Dangerfield	36	Executive chef	Puebla, Mexico	Eliminated after seventh service
Anthony Vo	28	Executive chef	Sacramento, California	Eliminated on the Cook for Your Life challenge
Meghan Ellis	37	Executive chef	Honolulu, Hawaii	Eliminated after sixth service
Magali Ort	28	Executive chef	Huntington Beach, California	Eliminated after fifth service
Michael Lovano	27	Executive chef	Hudson, Ohio	Eliminated after third service
Corbin Emilio	36	Restaurant owner	Appleton, Wisconsin	Eliminated after second service
Uri Elbaum	27	Executive chef	Buenos Aires, Argentina	Quit before second service
Shant Halajian	29	Corporate executive chef	Glendale, California	Hospitalized before second service
Amber Evans	32	Head chef	San Diego, California	Eliminated after first service

== Contestant progress ==
No.	Chef	Original teams			Switched teams									Individuals			Finals
No.	Chef	2301/2302		2303	2304	2305	2306	2307	2308	2309	2310	2311	2312	2313	2314	2315	2316
1	Kyle	IN	LOSE	LOSE	LOSE	WIN	WIN	WIN	IN	NOM	WIN	BoW	IN	IN	IN	IN	WINNER
2	Hannah	IN	LOSE	WIN	LOSE	WIN	LOSE	LOSE	IN	WIN	LOSE	BoW	IN	IN	IN	IN	RUNNER-UP
3	Egypt	NOM (Note: Chef was nominated by the BoB (Best of the Best) as one of the weakest in the "Flambé" challenge)	LOSE	NOM	NOM	WIN	WIN	WIN	IN	LOSE	WIN	NOM	IN	IN	IN	OUT	Hannah's team
4	Whit	BoB	LOSE	WIN	LOSE	WIN	LOSE	LOSE	IN	WIN	LOSE	LOSE	IN	IN	OUT		Kyle's team
5	Brandon	BoB	LOSE	LOSE	LOSE	WIN	WIN	WIN	NOM	LOSE	WIN	LOSE	IN	OUT (Note: Brandon was eliminated in the post-mortem, without nomination)			Kyle's team
6	Amanda	IN	LOSE	WIN	LOSE	WIN	LOSE	LOSE	NOM	WIN	LOSE	NOM	OUT				Hannah's team
7	Joe	IN	LOSE	LOSE	LOSE	WIN	WIN	WIN	IN	LOSE	WIN	OUT					Kyle's team
8	Ann Marie	NOM	LOSE	WIN	NOM	WIN	LOSE	NOM	NOM	WIN	NOM	OUT					Hannah's team
9	Brittany	NOM	LOSE	WIN	LOSE	WIN	NOM	LOSE	IN	WIN	OUT						Hannah's team
10	Lulu	IN	LOSE	WIN	LOSE	WIN	WIN	WIN	NOM	OUT							Kyle's team
11	Anthony	IN	LOSE	LOSE	LOSE	WIN	WIN	WIN	OUT								
12	Meghan	IN	LOSE	WIN	LOSE	WIN	NOM	OUT									
13	Magali	IN	NOM	WIN	NOM	WIN	OUT										
14	Michael	IN	NOM	LOSE	OUT												
15	Corbin	IN	LOSE	OUT													
16	Uri	IN	LOSE	LEFT													
17	Shant	NOM	NOM	HOSP													
18	Amber	IN	OUT														

Keywords

- WIN = Won the dinner service
- LOSE = Lost the dinner service
- BoB = Best of the Best, usually exempt from nomination
- BoW = Best of the Worst, sometimes exempt from nomination
- IN = not nominated for elimination
- NOM = nominated for elimination
- OUT = eliminated normally
- LEFT = withdrew from competition
- HOSP = eliminated due to hospitalization
- EJEC = eliminated during service

Color key
Chef was eliminated after regular nomination
Chef was eliminated after Ramsay's nomination
Chef was eliminated without nomination
Chef was eliminated from winning team
Chef was eliminated in the Cook For Your Life challenge
Chef was nominated to participate in the Cook For Your Life challenge
Chef was eliminated during service
Chef withdrew from the competition
Chef was the Best of the Best/Worst
Chef was retained after regular nomination
Chef was retained after Ramsay's nomination
Chef's nomination was voided
The winner of Hell's Kitchen
The runner-up of Hell's Kitchen

== Episodes ==
No. overall	No. in season	Title	Original release date	Prod. code	U.S. viewers (millions)
347	1	"Hell Heads East"	September 26, 2024	HK-2301	1.58
Eighteen chefs sailed by boat and were escorted by the Coast Guard. They had 40 minutes to cook their signature dish for chef Ramsay. Team challenge/signature dish: Brittany cut her thumb, and had to remake her dough after blood got into it. Ramsay scored the signature dishes on a scale of 1 to 5. Seven chefs received a 5, ten received a 4, and Amber got a 3. The women won, 40–38. Punishment/reward: The women dined with Ramsay at the Foxwoods Resort Casino. The men had to clean both kitchens and take in multiple deliveries. Uri decided to take charge of announcing and checking off orders the entire punishment in order to "be a leader", much to his teammates' annoyance for his laziness and nonstop talking, who wanted him to help put the delivery away instead. The chefs were given their recipe books. The episode ended on a cliffhanger, with the chefs going outside to a press conference and Ramsay wielding a flamethrower.
348	2	"The Flame Game"	October 3, 2024	HK-2302	1.50
Individual challenge: The chefs competed for the punishment pass, awarded to one member of each team. The chefs had 40 minutes to cook a dish using flambe. Whit burned the skin of her salmon while cooking, and took it off. Each team had to pick their top 3 dishes for Ramsay to taste. Ramsay selected Whit from the red team and Brandon from the blue team to each win a punishment pass. Ramsay had Whit and Brandon select the bottom two dishes from their teams (Shant and Egypt from the blue team, Brittany and Ann Marie from the red team). Due to the quality of all four dishes, nobody was eliminated yet. Service: The chefs received their HexClad knives and began the first East Coast service which had proved to be a big struggle for both teams. Amber accidentally put her scallops in the pan too early and undercooked them, and then didn't cook enough scallops. Meanwhile, Corbin's first attempt on carbonara had to be redone by Shant, due to them being watery and broken. Shant then mistakenly added water to the risotto and didn't put enough salt while ignoring Egypt's feedback but recovered. Magali basted the salmon too early and tuned out Hannah for a while, before sending out undercooked and then overcooked salmon. Michael and Egypt undercooked and overcooked lambs but recovered. Joe served raw salmon and halibut, while Egypt overcooked a Wellington, leading the men to getting kicked out. Hannah was lectured for piercing chickens and then overcooked them, causing the women to also get kicked out and making this one of the worst opening services in the show's history. Both teams lost and had to nominate two chefs for elimination. Elimination: For the women, Amanda nominated Magali and Amber from the fish station. For the men, Uri nominated Michael (meat) and Shant (appetizers). After hearing the chefs' pleas, Ramsay sent both Magali & Michael back in line and eliminated Amber for her poor performance on the fish station and being unable to count scallops, finally he also sent Shant back in line. Ramsay's comment: "Amber's inability to cook or even count scallops was all I needed to know that I couldn't count on her to be my next head chef."
349	3	"Shucking Hell"	October 10, 2024	HK-2303	1.37
The chefs were woken up early by the sous-chefs to pick up frozen seafood. Uri and Shant suffered pain after bringing in the seafood. Team challenge: The two teams were given 30 minutes to make a seafood tower, featuring 8 hot seafood appetizers. The blue team dropped Brandon's oyster dish. Hannah & Egypt both scored on oysters, Brittany scored over Shant on lobster, Whit scored over Uri on squid, Kyle scored over Magali on crab, both Amanda & Anthony scored on prawns, both Meghan & Michael scored on mussels, Joe scored over Lulu on clams, and finally Ann Marie scored over Corbin on scallops. Corbin overcooked his scallops, costing the blue team the final point. The final score was 6-5. Punishment/reward: The women went paddling in kayaks. The men had to prepare seafood, including 100 pounds of mussels, for service. Medical evacuations: Shant suffered further pain and went to the hospital, withdrawing from the competition. Uri also voluntarily withdrew from the competition due to leg pain. Service: Cincinnati Bengals defensive end Trey Hendrickson and Atlanta Falcons linebacker Matthew Judon dined at the chef's tables. Brittany burned her first attempt on pizza, but recovered. On appetizers, Corbin and Egypt served overcooked scallops and lobster respectively, but they also recovered. The red team had to refire salmon after Hannah forgot to start the garnish. Egypt brought up salmon too early, but it was overcooked, while Brandon delivered an undercooked New York strip. Brandon served raw lamb to the chef's table, so Ramsay forced the men to apologize, while also berating Corbin for idling around instead of helping Brandon. Both teams successfully completed service, with the women declared the winners. The men had to nominate two chefs for elimination. Elimination: Kyle nominated Egypt and Corbin from the fish station. Ramsay eliminated Corbin for being disengaged throughout service and then sent Egypt back in line. Ramsay's comment: "Corbin may be tall in stature, but tonight he was short in talent."
350	4	"In a Pickle"	October 17, 2024	HK-2304	1.48
Team change: Ramsay had Lulu switch to the blue team, to even out the numbers at 7 each. Team challenge: The chefs played pickleball to hit balls into barrels with specific ingredients, and pick a chef to cook against who hit a ball to pick the protein. The chefs had to cook dishes using pickling. Guest chef Dan Barber judged the dishes. Lulu scored over Amanda on sole with pickled brussel sprouts due to Amanda forgetting her pickles, both Ann Marie & Joe scored on cod with pickled apples, both Hannah & Kyle scored on duck breast with pickled okra, Egypt scored over Meghan on salmon with pickled pineapple, Whit scored over Michael on prawns with pickled blueberries due to Michael leaving the shells on the prawns, Brittany scored over Anthony on mahi mahi with pickled carrots due Anthony undercooking his carrots. Finally, Brandon scored over Magali on pork chop with pickled red beets making the score was 5-4, with the blue team winning their first challenge. Punishment/reward: Whit used her punishment pass, switching places with Egypt. The blue team and Whit went to the private island of Grace Island overnight at a luxury mansion. The red team and Egypt had to process 15 tons of cow manure on a farm. Amanda suffered shortness of breath, but recovered. Service: Olympic gold medalist Sheryl Swoopes and Super Bowl champion Vernon Davis sat at the red and blue chef's tables. On appetizers, Egypt and Michael undercooked their first attempts on carbonara and scallops, but recovered. In the red kitchen, Amanda brought up the scallops too early and Ann Marie mistakenly added peas to the risotto but recovered. On entrées, Lulu undercooked the halibut, but recovered. Magali served bland mashed potatoes, but recovered. Joe served raw lamb twice, leading Ramsay to kick the blue team out. After Amanda served raw halibut, the red team was also kicked out, making this the second time both teams were kicked out this season. Both teams had to nominate two chefs for elimination. Elimination: In the red team, Hannah nominated Magali (garnish) and Ann Marie (appetizers). In the blue team, Anthony nominated Michael (fish) and Egypt (appetizers). Ramsay sent Magali, Egypt and Ann Marie back in line and eliminated Michael for his lack of confidence and poor performance. Ramsay's comment: "When a chef can't look at you in the eye, you know they're hiding something. One thing Michael couldn't hide was the fact that he didn't belong here.'"
351	5	"Homesick in Hell"	October 24, 2024	HK-2305	1.51
Team challenge: Each team had to cook 7 burgers head-to-head. Since the blue team was short one member, Kyle had to cook 2 burgers. The chefs had 90 seconds to race for tickets containing ingredients, and 35 minutes to make their burgers. Hamburger America owner George Motz was the guest judge. Both Magali & Egypt scored on venison, Brandon scored over Ann Marie on bison, Meghan scored over Lulu on chicken, Neither Brittany or Kyle(due to forgetting his sauce) scored on dry-aged beef, Anthony scored over Amanda on pork, Hannah scored over Joe on short rib. Finally, Whit scored over Kyle on lamb. The score was 4-3, with the red team winning. Punishment/reward: The red team went bowling at the Foxwoods High Rollers Luxury Lanes, and were gifted Hexclad sets by Ramsay. The blue team had to roll patties for a special slider appetizer by breaking 100 pounds of beef and grinding it by hand. Brandon chose not to use his punishment pass. Pep talk: Egypt said he was considering withdrawing from the competition, due to missing his family. Ramsay talked to him in the store room, and told him that he still believed in him. Egypt ultimately chose to stay. Service: Joe served raw sliders, but recovered. Whit served raw scallops, forcing Ramsay to tell her and Meghan to communicate, and Whit also recovered. A diner successfully proposed during service. Both teams successfully completed service (albeit with a lack of communication), were declared joint winners, and nobody was eliminated.
352	6	"Hell on Wheels"	October 31, 2024	HK-2306	1.72
Team challenge: The chefs had to cook with pasta, with matchups chosen randomly and pasta types chosen using pachinko. Whit and Brittany both cooked tortellini, with Whit's dish dropped. Angie Rito and Scott Tacinelli were the guest judges with each chef earning up to 2 points for their dish. Both judges gave Anthony a point over Meghan on cavatelli, Magali scored over Egypt on orecchiette, Amanda scored over Lulu on cannelloni, both Ann Marie & Kyle scored on pappardelle, Joe scored over Hannah on fettucine. Finally, both Brittany & Brandon scored on tortellini. The score was tied 6-6, with Joe's dish being judged the best, resulting in the blue team winning. Whit's tortellini was judged better than Brittany's, which would have let the red team win. Punishment/reward: The blue team went Kart racing with Ramsay. The red team had to make fresh fettuccine from scratch. Service: Lulu served undercooked lobster, then Brandon served undercooked and watery carbonara, but both recovered. The red team completed appetizers without major problems but fell apart on entrées. Brittany served 6 meat entrées instead of 4. Magali served salty halibut, then overcooked halibut, and then raw halibut. The red team was kicked out and had to nominate two chefs for elimination. The blue successfully completed dinner service and were declared the winners, with Anthony, Egypt and Joe receiving praise for their stellar performances. Elimination: Whit nominated Brittany (meat) and Meghan (fish). Ramsay sent both of them back in line and instead eliminated Magali for her failures on the fish station and her third poor dinner service performance. Ramsay's comment: "Tonight was anything but a home run for the red team. And for Magali, it's three strikes and you're out."
353	7	"Harmony in Hell"	November 7, 2024	HK-2307	1.54
Team challenge: The chefs received a performance from the Yale Whiffenpoofs. The chefs had 45 minutes to grab 5 ingredients, one at a time per singing round, and cook beef dishes. Ramsay judged the dishes head-to-head. Brandon scored over Brittany on New York strip, both Meghan & Kyle scored on tomahawk, Egypt scored over Hannah on ribcap, both Ann Marie & Joe scored on ribeye, Amanda scored over Lulu on filet. Finally, Whit scored over Anthony on T-bone. With the final score being 4 to 4, Ramsay broke the tie based on the best dish, which was Egypt's ribeye cap, resulting in the blue team winning. Punishment/reward: The blue team had a pool party and went to a spa. The red team had to prepare butter and chimichurri for steak night, including picking thyme by hand. Pep talk: Hannah had a pep talk with Michelle in the storeroom over her trauma regarding her husband committing suicide 3 years prior. Michelle convinced Hannah to remain in the competition, telling her she had the potential to win. Service: The chef's tables feature the Garcia Twins in the blue kitchen, and Patti Stanger in the red kitchen. Hannah had to redo her risotto for the chef's table due to it being broken, but recovered. Amanda served raw lobster for the risotto, but recovered. Lulu served underseasoned mashed potatoes and had trouble getting out her garnish on time for the chef's table, but recovered. Meghan served raw salmon and Ann Marie served undercooked garnish. The first team to finish the last two tables was the blue team, who won the service with a strong performance. The red team served raw veal, causing them to lose and having to nominate two individuals for elimination. Elimination: Despite Amanda's poor performance resulting in the red team's loss, Brittany nominated Ann Marie (garnish) and Meghan (fish). Ramsay sent Ann Marie back in line and eliminated Meghan for being nominated twice and her inconsistent performances. Ramsay's comment: "When Meghan arrived from Hawaii, I was hopeful she would be a breath of fresh air. However, she was anything but. Aloha, Meghan."
354	8	"Get a Clue!"	November 14, 2024	HK-2308	1.70
Team challenge: The chefs played Secret Ingredients, with pairs of chefs having to guess ingredients and assign them to their dishes. Each team had 45 minutes to work with 3 proteins: airline chicken, cod, and a pork chop. The blue team dropped Egypt's pork chop. Ramsay judged the dishes, with the final scores being 3 to 2, resulting in the red team winning. Egypt's dish was judged to be the best dish, meaning the blue team would have won had they put up his dish. Punishment/reward: The red team went to Foxwoods Smash Avenue and a karaoke bar and restaurant. The blue team had to sort compost, recycling, and waste from dumpsters. Cook For Your Life (CFYL) challenge: The 5 chefs with the worst dishes in the challenge, Anthony, Brandon, Lulu, Ann Marie, and Amanda, had to cook for their lives in the competition. They had 45 minutes to cook a lobster entrée. Brandon, Lulu, Amanda, and Ann Marie survived. Elimination: Ramsay eliminated Anthony because his dish had a feather blade in it and was poor quality. However, he was praised for his great attitude and tenacity, because of which Ramsay permitted Anthony to keep his jacket, the first time a blue team member got to do so. Ramsay's comment: "Anthony had a heart of gold. But I need a head chef with a golden touch, and he just doesn't have it yet."
355	9	"Lonely in the Kitchen"	November 21, 2024	HK-2309	1.71
Team challenge: The two teams had 45 minutes to make a five-course menu, consisting of two appetizers and three entrées. One chef from each team had to leave the kitchen every 10 minutes, until the last 5 minutes, when all the chefs were in the kitchen. Ramsay judged the dishes, with the final score being 5 to 5. Ramsay broke the tie with the best dish, which was Hannah's, resulting in the red team winning the challenge. Punishment/reward: Brandon used his punishment pass, trading places with Ann Marie. The red team and Brandon stayed overnight in New York City at the Edge at Hudson Yards, including experiencing the city climb and going sailing. The blue team and Ann Marie had to bake bread overnight. Service: Kyle initially forgot to serve scallops, but recovered. Brittany was late in delivering her lobster, but recovered. Lulu served raw wellingtons, but recovered. Brittany served raw halibut, but recovered. Many former Hell's Kitchen contestants sat in the dining room. Kyle served overcooked halibut, then Lulu served raw steak. Ramsay kicked out the blue team due to their series of mistakes, and had them nominate two chefs for elimination. The red team completed service, and were declared the winners. Elimination: Egypt nominated Lulu (meat) and Kyle (fish), though he was also considered for his performance on the appetizer station. Ramsay sent Kyle back in line and eliminated Lulu for her mistakes on the meat station and declining performance after a promising start. Lulu stood before the exit, forcing Ramsay to remind her to push the door. Ramsay's comment: "Lulu showed great promise at the start of this competition, but it's not how you start, it's how you finish. And Lulu finished poorly."
356	10	"A Sticky Situation"	December 5, 2024	HK-2310	1.60
Team challenge: This was the 23rd blind taste test challenge. If chefs missed more than 2 items, syrup and other breakfast items would be dropped on a teammate. Amanda scored a perfect four points while Brandon got two, Ann-Marie scored zero points while Joe got one, Hannah scored three points while Kyle scored zero. In the final round, Whit scored two points, and Egypt scored zero. The final score was 9 to 3, with the women winning the challenge. Punishment/reward: The women went to a dessert suite, received OXO cooking equipment, and a $250 shopping spree each. The men had to clean up the mess caused by the challenge. Joe began to feel increasingly homesick for his wife and children, but powered through. Service: Two-time NBA champion Lamar Odom and magicians Penn & Teller sat at the blue and red tables. Amanda served overcooked scallops that were cut improperly by Brittany, but recovered. Egypt shut down briefly on communication for the meat table, but recovered. Ann Marie served undercooked steak, but recovered. Kyle fell behind on garnishes, but recovered. Amanda failed to communicate while dealing with Brittany's improperly prepared salmon while Ann Marie struggled to cook meat, but both eventually bounced back. Both teams successfully completed service albeit with a few bumps, and Ramsay declared the men the winners for having less problems. Elimination: Amanda nominated Brittany for being disorganized and constantly needing help for her teammates and Ann Marie for her inconsistency in services. All the chefs on the red team believed Brittany should be eliminated, which Ramsay agreed with, in the end Ramsay sent Ann Marie back in line and eliminated Brittany for losing her team's confidence and being unable to handle tonight's dinner service alone, though he praised her for her heart. Ramsay's comment: "Brittany's team felt they needed to hold her hand. So it was time for me to lead her out the door."
357	11	"A Soap Opera in Hell"	January 2, 2025	HK-2311	1.86
Team challenge: The chefs had 45 minutes to cook four different international cuisines, after being randomly assigned countries and chefs to cook against. The four cuisines were Chinese (cooked by Whit and Kyle), French (cooked by Hannah and Brandon), Greek (cooked by Amanda and Joe), and Mexican (cooked by Ann Marie and Egypt). Guest judge Vikas Khanna judged the dishes. The score was 3 to 3, with men winning because Egypt had the best dish. Punishment/reward: The men went to Foxwoods Resort Casino and Pequot Museum, and were served by Native American chef Sherry Pocknett. The women had to bake cupcakes from scratch. Whit, being annoyed and grumpy with baking and the prep work, left the kitchen at one point. Service: It was the charity night dinner service, with each chef overseeing one course each. The women cooked for the American Heart Association including its members Susan Lucci and Tunde Oyenryin, while the men cooked for the Special Olympics with Special Olympics gold medalist Brandon Knight and board member Brett Glaser among the contributors. Egypt struggled to communicate to his teammates during his course. Amanda didn't tell Whit and Hannah to cook enough gnocchi, which delayed the course. Joe was short on scallops after seasoning some too early, and Ann Marie had to deal with scallops being burned while also being berated for talking back to Ramsay, but both recovered. Brandon's pan was lit on fire, but he also recovered. Both teams successfully complete service, but due to the mistakes made in both kitchens Ramsay named both teams as losers. Kyle and Hannah were declared the Best of the Worst, and each had to nominate two chefs for elimination. Double Elimination: Kyle nominated Joe and Egypt, and Hannah nominated Amanda and Ann Marie. Ramsay sent Egypt back in line, and eliminated Ann Marie for her downward spiral on the past several services, but praised her effort and dedication. Ramsay then eliminated Joe for a lack of consistency and sent Amanda back in line. Ramsay's comment: "Both Joe and Ann Marie couldn't stay afloat on the fish station tonight. If you can't master that, you have no chance of being my next head chef."
358	12	"Black Jacket Time"	January 9, 2025	HK-2312	1.70
With this season being the twenty-third season of Hell's Kitchen, Ramsay introduces each locker containing the #23 jerseys of Michael Jordan, Season 10 chef's table guest diner David Beckham, Christian McCaffrey and LeBron James before Marino opens the final locker to reveal six black jackets inside much to the chefs' surprise. But, unfortunately, one chef will not receive theirs. Black Jacket Challenge 1: In the first challenge, the chefs had to cook a dish using the same seven ingredients: veal chop, celery root, mushrooms, bourbon, pancetta, kale and dry figs. Hannah's and Brandon's dishes were judged as the best two dishes by Ramsay, and they received the first two Black Jackets. Black Jacket Challenge 2: The remaining chefs had just 23 minutes to make anything. Whit nearly broke down from the pressure after not making it the first round, but bounced back. Her five spice pork loin and Kyle's duck breast with dashi were judged as the best two dishes by Ramsay, and they received the next two Black Jackets. Black Jacket Challenge 3: Amanda and Egypt were tasked with preparing a dish inspired by their mentors. The latter's pan-seared filet mignon with tortilla brown butter ravioli was determined to be slightly better than the former's miso-glazed cod and crispy rice cake and Egypt received the final Black Jacket, eliminating Amanda. Ramsay allowed Amanda to keep her jacket and she received a retrospective montage. Ramsay gave no comment on Amanda's elimination, and Amanda did not receive the burning picture sequence.
359	13	"Five Comedians Walk into Hell..."	January 16, 2025	HK-2313	1.99
Challenge: The final five chefs had to teach five comedians how to make Ramsay's lobster ravioli. The pairings were as follows: Brandon-Jim Norton, Egypt-Jeff Dye, Hannah-Yamaneika Saunders, Kyle-Judy Gold, and Whit-Druski. Whit won the challenge. Reward/punishment: Whit chose Kyle to go with her on a shopping spree to Kitch with $1,000 each to spend. They were also joined by Sous-Chef Michelle for lunch. Brandon, Egypt and Hannah had to clean both kitchens and hand-polish the stainless steel for service. Service: Appetizers went smoothly, save for Hannah's slow start on risotto. On entrées, however, Brandon struggled on meat, sending raw chicken and raw lamb as well as having trouble recalling the ticket for the pass. After he sent an overcooked wellington to the pass, Ramsay ordered Hannah to jump on meat, after which a properly cooked wellington was finally delivered. Service was completed without further problems. Elimination: After praising Hannah and Kyle for bouncing back, and Whit and Egypt for their performances, Ramsay eliminated Brandon without nomination due to him being the worst performer of the night but gave him encouragement. Brandon received a retrospective montage. Ramsay then dismissed the remaining final four chefs. Ramsay's comment: "Throughout the competition, at times I could see Brandon as my next head chef. But after tonight's performance, I could only see him going home."
360	14	"Hell at the Pass"	January 23, 2025	HK-2314	1.84
Challenge: The four chefs had two hours in total, with one hour for prep and fifteen minutes for four rounds, to serve diners table-side from four stations. The diners voted on the best and worst chefs. Kyle won the challenge with 75% of the vote, and chose Whit to join him. Reward/punishment: Kyle and Whit went on a cruise on a river. Egypt and Hannah had to prep the dining room and polish the glassware. Service: Mickey Guyton was in attendance. The final four chefs took turns running the pass, with planned sabotages by Ramsay. Each chef took turns yelling at Ramsay beforehand. Egypt ran the pass first, and caught his first two sabotages, but confused venison wellingtons for beef wellingtons. Hannah ran the pass second, catching her first sabotage. During Hannah's running of the pass, Whit missed her first risotto, but recovered. For her last sabotage, Hannah confused pheasant for chicken. Whit ran the pass third. Whit caught her two sabotages. During Whit's running of the pass, Egypt served undercooked raw New York strip, but recovered. Kyle ran the pass last. During Kyle's running of the pass, Whit missed carbonara and pancetta and lashed out angrily at the others for not stocking the kitchen, but quickly calmed herself down and recovered. Kyle caught all three of his sabotages. Elimination: Ramsay asked the final four chefs why they should advance to the finals. Ramsay chose Egypt, Hannah and finally Kyle to advance to the final, eliminating Whit for losing her composure, but praised her for being a powerhouse. Whit got to keep her jacket, but did not receive a retrospective montage. Ramsay's comment: "Whit was as talented as she was confident. But when the chips were down, she lost her cool and lost the job."
361	15	"One Hell of a Ride"	January 30, 2025	HK-2315	1.94
The final three each randomly picked a sous-chef. Kyle was assigned to sous-chef James, Egypt to guest chef Kesha Tatro, and Hannah to sous-chef Michelle. The chefs met their families afterwards and had lunch with Ramsay. They then went shopping, toured the Foxwoods restaurant and experienced a trip down memory lane of their best moments throughout this season. They were then greeted by a studio audience, the setting for their menu challenge. Individual challenge: The final three chefs had one hour to prepare a five-course menu, consisting of a cold and hot appetizer and a fish, chicken and beef entreé, to be judged by Sherry Pocknett, David Shim, Stephanie Izard, Douglass Williams and Foxwoods CEO Jason Guyot. Hannah, Kyle and Egypt received a 9, 10, and 9 in the first round; a 10, 10, and 9 in the second; an 8, 9, and a 10 in the third; a 9, 10, and an 8 in the fourth; and a 10, 9, and a 9 in the final round. The final scores were 46, 48, and 45. Kyle and Hannah advanced to the finale and Egypt was automatically eliminated. Kyle got to pick his final brigade first for having the highest score. Brigade selection: Kyle chose Brandon, Joe, Whit and Lulu. Hannah picked Egypt, Brittany, Amanda and was left with Ann Marie. Ramsay did not comment on Egypt's elimination, he did not receive a portrait burning sequence, nor a retrospective montage.
362	16	"Hell's Finish Line"	February 6, 2025	HK-2316	1.97
Kyle and Hannah went through their final menus with their respective brigades. Hannah was worried believing everyone is against her, but her brigades believed in her, with all of them being targeted by their teams in the past. Kyle went simple on his menu, whilst for Hannah's menu, each of her items have their own unique name, based on her culinary background. Kyle and Hannah prepared their teams for the final dinner service, and received their head chef's jackets. Ramsay gave both an all-expenses paid trip after the finale, with three other people each, to the Great Wolf Lodge, a swimming park at Foxwoods. Service: Both Kyle and Hannah had no trouble going through appetizers, with the only issues are Lulu forgetting basil oil in her salads, Brittany burned her first gnocchi, and Brandon overcooked octopus, but they all recovered. On entrées, Egypt bounced back after sending a cold toast. In the blue kitchen, Joe served raw scallops two times, causing him to be threatened with Kyle kicking him out from service, but recovered. Ann Marie served dry chicken during the final table, causing Hannah to send it back to refire but quickly recovered. Both kitchens successfully completed service at a steady pace. Ramsay called Hannah and Kyle into his office for the last time, offering praise for their accomplishments throughout the season, and asked them to stand in front of two doors. Kyle's door opened, making him the 23rd winner of Hell's Kitchen. Kyle thanked everybody in a victory speech, and Hannah took her defeat graciously. Ramsay's comment: "Kyle is everything I want in a head chef and more. Along with incredible charisma, he brings his expertise, passion, and creativity every time he enters the kitchen. He's going to be a great asset at Hell's Kitchen Foxwoods Resort and Casino."
