= Daniel Mac =

American social media personality and digital creator (born 1997)

- Born: Daniel Macdonald; October 8, 1997 (age 28); Tucson, Arizona, U.S
- Education: University of Arizona
- Occupations: Social media personality; digital creator; filmmaker
- Known for: "What Do You Do For A Living?" Videos

TikTok information
- Page: itsdanielmac
- Followers: 14.2 million

YouTube information
- Channel: Itsdanielmac
- Subscribers: 3.31 million
- Views: 2.7 billion
- Last updated: May 10, 2025

Daniel Macdonald (Note: Also spelled in sources as McDonald or Macdonald.) (born 8 October 1997), known as Daniel Mac, is an American social media personality. He rose to popularity on social media by approaching owners of luxury cars and celebrities, asking them "What do you do for a living?", and then posting the interaction on YouTube, Facebook, TikTok and Instagram.

== Background and early life ==
Daniel Mac is originally from Tucson, Arizona. He began shooting his interview videos in Tucson. He then moved to Dallas and then Los Angeles, California. He has a bachelor's degree in Finance from the University of Arizona.

== Career ==
Mac is known for approaching luxury car owners, inquiring about their occupations, then posting these encounters online. He started out by making these videos in Dallas, before moving to Los Angeles, where there is a significant concentration of expensive cars. In early 2022, he signed with the Creative Artists Agency (CAA) for representation, quitting working at Charles Schwab Corporation. He has a combined social media following of over 20 million followers and over 5 billion views across all platforms. He has interviewed in his videos CEOs, celebrities, a variety of discreetly affluent individuals, and occasionally, the spouses and children of wealthy people. Some examples include President Joe Biden, Wiz Khalifa, Jay Leno, Barbara Corcoran, etc. He has also had on Indian actor Ranveer Singh and Iranian businessman Manny Khoshbin. His interviews have featured sports personalities like Lewis Hamilton, Shaquille O'Neal, Giannis Antetokounmpo, and more. The top 5 most featured cars in his videos are Lamborghini, Ferrari, McLaren, Porsche and Mercedes-Benz. His work has also involved covering events and collaborations with brands like Chevy, Bugatti, Gillette, and Formula One. Others include Heineken USA, Activision, Amazon, Epic Games and Xbox, amongst others.

=== Celebrity appearances ===
He also runs a podcast, The Daniel Mac Show, on which he has featured celebrity guests, including Barbara Corcoran, who on the show, exclusively revealed her most profitable deal from the TV show Shark Tank.

His interview with Apple vice president of procurement, Tony Blevins, led to the latter being fired from his role at Apple after making an inappropriate comment in the TikTok video. In the video, he mentioned fondling women with big breasts. The video gained significant attention on social media and within Apple, leading to an investigation by the company's human resources department and ultimately, the sacking of Blevins by Jeff Williams.

While driving a $148,495 BMW i8 in the streets of Los Angeles, California, Liza Soberano met Mac, "Hi! What do you do for a living? Your car is awesome," exclaimed Mac, who featured her in a TikTok video: "Casually meeting the largest [Filipino] actress". "I'm an actress. A lot of my work is in the Philippines, so you probably don't recognize me," she replied.

=== Legends Rally & Quiet/rly.slo viral video ===
Mac started a car rally series in 2022, which many of the worlds' largest car content creators have attended, including Daily Driven Exotics, Tanner Fox, and Alex Choi.

In 2024, Mac released a video in the style of his “What do you do for a living?” series with Quiet Racing founder and anonymous car influencer rly.slo, implying that he would reveal a new car while attending Mac’s Legends Rally event. The video became one of his most successful posts, gaining more than 30 million views across his social media platforms.

== Personal life ==
He resided in Dallas, Texas, and then moved to Los Angeles. He bought his dream car, the Porsche Cayman GT4.
