= Tony Messina =

Tony Messina is a Boston area chef who won the 2019 James Beard Foundation Award for Best Chef in the Northeast. The East Boston native was the executive chef and partner at Ken Oringer’s restaurant Uni., Messina was a semifinalist in 2017 and a nominee in 2018 in the same category. He finally won in 2019.

He was valedictorian of his class at the Cambridge Culinary School.

In 2021, he moved to Los Angeles.
