= Hell's Kitchen (American TV series) season 7 =

Hell's Kitchen
- Season 7
- Region 1 DVD cover
- Hosted by: Gordon Ramsay
- No. of contestants: 16
- Winner: Holli Ugalde
- Runner-up: Jason "Jay" Santos
- No. of episodes: 15

Release
- Original network: Fox
- Original release: June 1 – August 10, 2010

Season chronology
- ← Previous; Season 6 Next → Season 8

The seventh season of the American competitive reality television series Hell's Kitchen premiered on Fox on June 1, 2010, and concluded on August 10, 2010. Gordon Ramsay returned as host and head chef, while Scott Leibfried returned as the Blue Team's sous-chef and Andi Van Willigan debuted as the Red Team's sous-chef, replacing Heather West. Jean-Philippe Susilovic returned as maître d'.

The season was won by banquet chef Holli Ugalde, with executive chef Jason "Jay" Santos finishing second.

Ugalde was promised the head chef position at the prize restaurant. Filming had concluded in February 2009, 16 months prior to the premiere of this season, when the hotel reopened in 2010; however, she was not given the job. Ramsay stated that the American Ugalde could not work in London due to visa problems, but the latter called that explanation an excuse, saying, "I don't know if they even applied for my visa". She was later awarded an undisclosed amount of money in compensation and retained her title as the winner of season seven.

== Contestants ==
Sixteen chefs competed in season seven.

Contestant	Age (at time of filming)	Occupation	Hometown	Result
Holli Ugalde	24	Banquet chef	San Bernardino, California	Winner
Jason "Jay" Santos	32	Executive chef	Melrose, Massachusetts	Runner-Up
Benjamin Knack (Note: Chef returned to Hell's Kitchen in Season 17 and finished as the runner-up.)	33	Culinary instructor	Elmont, New York	Eliminated before Finals
Autumn Lewis	29	Personal chef	Chicago, Illinois	Eliminated before Finals
Jason Ellis	37	Personal chef	Greenville, South Carolina	Eliminated after Twelfth Service
Ed Battaglia	28	High school cooking teacher	Burlington, New Jersey	Eliminated after Eleventh Service
Nilka Hendricks	28	Line cook	Glen Cove, New York	Ejected during Tenth Service
Frances "Fran" Klier	44	Catering chef	Rockville Centre, New York	Eliminated after Ninth Service
Siobhan Allgood	25	Pub executive chef	Rockledge, Pennsylvania	Eliminated after Eighth Service
Salvatore Coppola	35	Pizzeria chef	Laurel Springs, New Jersey	Eliminated after Seventh Service
Scott Hawley	32	Executive chef	Modesto, California	Eliminated after Sixth Service
Maria Torrisi	24	Kitchen supervisor	Scranton, Pennsylvania	Eliminated after Fifth Service
Jamie Bisioulis	26	Sous chef	Chicago, Illinois	Eliminated after Third Service
Michael "Mikey" Termini	29	Line cook	Santa Cruz, California	Eliminated after Second Service
Andrew Forster	28	Farmer	West Babylon, New York	Quit during Second Service
Stacey Slichta	38	Private chef	Buffalo, New York	Eliminated after First Service

== Contestant progress ==
No.	Chef	Original teams				1st switch		2nd switch			3rd switch	Individuals				Finals
No.	Chef	701	702	703	704	705	706	707	708	709	710	711	712	713	714	715
1	Holli	LOSE	LOSE	LOSE	WIN	LOSE	LOSE	LOSE	LOSE	LOSE	WIN	IN	IN	IN	IN	WINNER
2	Jay	WIN	LOSE	WIN	WIN	WIN	WIN	WIN	LOSE	LOSE	WIN	IN	IN	BoB	IN	RUNNER-UP
3	Benjamin	WIN	LOSE	WIN	WIN	WIN	WIN	LOSE	LOSE	LOSE	WIN	IN	NOM	NOM	OUT	Jay's team
4	Autumn	LOSE	NOM	LOSE	NOM	WIN	WIN	WIN	NOM	NOM	NOM	NOM	IN	NOM	OUT	Holli's team
5	Jason	WIN	NOM	WIN	WIN	WIN	WIN	WIN	LOSE	LOSE	WIN	IN	OUT			Jay's team
6	Ed	WIN	LOSE	WIN	WIN	WIN	WIN	WIN	NOM	LOSE	NOM	OUT				
7	Nilka	LOSE	LOSE	LOSE	BoB	NOM	LOSE	LOSE	LOSE	LOSE	EJEC					Holli's team
8	Fran	NOM	LOSE	NOM	WIN	BoW	NOM	NOM	NOM	OUT						Jay's team
9	Siobhan	LOSE	LOSE	LOSE	WIN	LOSE	NOM	NOM	OUT							Holli's team
10	Salvatore	WIN	LOSE	WIN	BoB	WIN	WIN	OUT								
11	Scott	WIN	LOSE	WIN	NOM	NOM	OUT									
12	Maria	LOSE	LOSE	LOSE	WIN	OUT										
13	Jamie	LOSE	NOM	OUT												
14	Mikey	WIN	OUT													
15	Andrew	WIN	LEFT													
16	Stacey	OUT														

Keywords

- WIN = Won the dinner service
- LOSE = Lost the dinner service
- BoB = Best of the Best, usually exempt from nomination
- BoW = Best of the Worst, sometimes exempt from nomination
- IN = not nominated for elimination
- NOM = nominated for elimination
- OUT = eliminated normally
- LEFT = withdrew from competition
- HOSP = eliminated due to hospitalization
- EJEC = eliminated during service

Color key
Chef was eliminated after regular nomination
Chef was eliminated after Ramsay's nomination
Chef was eliminated without nomination
Chef was eliminated from winning team
Chef was eliminated in the Cook For Your Life challenge
Chef was nominated to participate in the Cook For Your Life challenge
Chef was eliminated during service
Chef withdrew from the competition
Chef was the Best of the Best/Worst
Chef was retained after regular nomination
Chef was retained after Ramsay's nomination
Chef's nomination was voided
The winner of Hell's Kitchen
The runner-up of Hell's Kitchen

== Episodes ==
No. overall	No. in season	Title	Original release date	U.S. viewers (millions)
79	1	"16 Chefs Compete"	June 1, 2010	6.22
Seventeen chefs (one of which was Ramsay's wife, Tana in disguise) were surprised by members of the press. Ramsay held a press conference, during which he promised that the opening night dinner service would be completed. Team challenge/signature dish: The chefs were given 45 minutes to cook their signature dishes for Ramsay, who would rate them on a one-five scale. He called one of them up and she presented her veal scallopini; he was impressed, so he hugged and kissed her. However, the others didn't realize that the mystery chef was Ramsay's wife, Tana. He explained that he used her to make a point that he didn't care about their experience. Once again, the men's dishes competed against the women's. Maria's pan-seared filet mignon scored over Salvatore's bucatina all'amatriciana since his pasta was pre-made and undercooked, Benjamin's lobster agnolotti scored over Holli's banana leaf-wrapped halibut, which was spat and thrown out. Neither Jamie's creamy chicken Kiev nor Scott's duck breast received a point; Ramsay refused to eat the former's dish as he found a toothpick embedded in the meat, and the latter's was deemed "rather pathetic" and unappetizing. Siobhan's seared ahi tuna and Mikey's lobster-stuffed brie both scored, Jay's steak scored over Stacey's fish, Jason's grits scored over Fran's pasta, and Autumn's chicken scored over Ed's fish. In the final round, neither Nilka's sweet and spicy chicken wings nor Andrew's steak tartare earned a point (the former's dish was too spicy due to the overuse of Tabasco sauce, and the latter's was bland), and the men won, four-three. Ramsay revealed that this season's winner would become the head chef at his restaurant at the Savoy Hotel in London. He then gave the chefs video demonstrations on how to cook various dishes, with a fire alarm siren preceding each video. Reward/punishment: The men were treated to breakfast in bed, with the women being forced to cook and serve it to them. Service: Jay and Nilka served tableside chicken Caesar salad. Both kitchens struggled through service. In the women's kitchen, Stacey over seasoned scallops while at the same time undercooking them, leading Siobhan to help her. Fran also undercooked potatoes, put crab instead of lobster in risotto, and earned Ramsay's ire by saying she was afraid of him. On entrées, Jamie served cold steak and Maria laughed after Ramsay reprimanded the former. Ramsay threw Maria, Jamie and Fran out of the kitchen and brought in Nilka. He then threw out Stacey for not knowing when her salmon would be ready. In the men's kitchen, Salvatore burned the shallots for the risotto twice, so Ramsay delegated him to making salads. He then tried to cook potatoes in a cold pan. Benjamin took over hot apps but was reprimanded for tasting the risotto with a spoon and then using that same spoon to stir the risotto. He also put the stock in before the rice while cooking risotto. Ramsay kicked both of them out for failing to provide accurate times and brought Jay into the kitchen. On entrées, Mikey served raw halibut after being pressured by Scott to bring it up, and got thrown out after serving it raw again. Ramsay then merged the teams together, and under the leadership of Ed, service was completed, fulfilling Ramsay's promise of completing the opening service for the first time in Hell's Kitchen history. Ramsay named the men winners for making fewer mistakes, and the women were told to nominate two chefs for elimination. Elimination: Stacey and Fran were nominated. Ramsay eliminated Stacey for her lackadaisical attitude and awful performance on fish. Stacey's comment: "I'm used to cooking for people at home and running the show. I completely screwed up. I screwed up. I took accountability for it, and kudos for me for standing up." Ramsay's comment: "It's a good thing Stacey's a private chef. Her food wasn't good enough for the public."
80	2	"15 Chefs Compete"	June 8, 2010	6.96
Team Challenge: The contestants were divided into pairs; each pair had to cook four egg dishes in four different styles (soft-boiled, poached, scrambled and sunny side up) in five minutes. Since the women had one less chef, Siobhan worked on her own, but accepted help from Autumn, which resulted in most of her eggs being disqualified by Ramsay. The men won 11-10. Reward/punishment: The men went on a helicopter ride around Los Angeles and had lunch with Ramsay and Jean-Philippe on top of a skyscraper. The women took in deliveries of tuna and prepped it for service. Service: Scott and Fran served tableside tuna tartare, but Fran struggled to find her way in the dining room until Jean-Phillipe helped her. In the men's kitchen, Salvatore was kicked out for not remembering the desserts but was allowed to come back after looking at the recipe book. On appetizers, Mikey repeatedly undercooked the risotto on the first table, which completely backed up the kitchen. When he finally got the risotto out, it was returned from the dining room for still being undercooked. On entrées, although Salvatore provided a perfectly cooked wellington, Jason undercooked the chicken and then tried to quickly fry it off in an attempt to get it up on time until Ramsay stopped him and made the team start the ticket over. Andrew served liquid mashed potatoes and withdrew from the competition after a brief argument with Ramsay. In the women's kitchen, Autumn put too much salt in pasta water before service and was scolded for taking over appetizers from Siobhan, whom Ramsay was equally mad at for surrendering her station. The women finished appetizers well before the men, but on entrees, Nilka fell behind on garnish and lost track of the orders while she, Holli, and Jamie struggled to time the orders correctly. Jamie also served scorched salmon, which Ramsay angrily smashed against the counter top. Andrew's exit: After Andrew added the liquid mashed potato to a fresh pot, he argued with Ramsay about it and got kicked out into the dining room. Either believing he was eliminated or feeling insulted by Ramsay’s remarks, Andrew began to walk out of the restaurant, and while Jean-Philippe tried to talk him out of quitting, saying there were many people who would want to be in his shoes, Andrew took off his shoes and walked out for good, making him the second chef since Jeff LaPoff from Season 1 to quit mid-service. Though Andrew walked out wearing his jacket, one of his other jackets and burnt photo was seen when Ramsay hung up Mikey's jacket. Ramsay gave no comment on Andrew's departure. Andrew's comment: "Chef Ramsay got pissed at me. I'm sure he looks at me as a little prick. You know, whatever, I don't really care what Chef Ramsay thinks of me. I'm done. Have a nice day." After Andrew’s departure, both teams managed to finish service with no further ejections; however, Ramsay named both teams losers and told them to nominate one chef for elimination. Elimination: The women nominated Autumn and the men nominated Jason. However, Ramsay questioned Autumn's nomination, and sent her back in line after Maria admitted that Jamie was instead the worst chef on the team. However, Ramsay spared Jamie and Jason, and instead eliminated Mikey for his second terrible service performance in a row. Mikey's comment: "Chef Ramsay really didn't like my performance. I know I did crappy, but I still got my tattoo of Hell's Kitchen, and I wear it with pride. I don't regret a thing coming here, and I accept my fate." Ramsay's comment: "Mikey was all about appearances. Unfortunately for him, it didn't appear he could cook."
81	3	"13 Chefs Compete"	June 15, 2010	5.67
Team challenge: In a Team Communication challenge, teams served lunch to members of the University of Southern California Marching Band and Cheerleaders; the team that finished first won. Jason was scolded for not calling back the order and worked slowly on salads, holding up his team, until Benjamin helped him. Maria and Jamie fought over control of the grill, while Scott served an undercooked burger. The women narrowly won their first challenge in a close finish. Reward/punishment: The women were rewarded with a trip to the beach and played a game of soccer with Ramsay and his family while the men had to clean a portion of the Los Angeles River and were transported there via a rundown bus. Service: Before service, Fran burned her hand carrying a pot of hot water, but refused to see a medic. Holli and Salvatore were chosen as maitre d' assistants, but Salvatore struggled with misspelling and poor handwriting and contemplated quitting the competition (it was later revealed that he was unable to attend school when he was younger due to supporting his family), but Jean-Philippe successfully convinced him to fight back and stay. In the men's kitchen, Scott served poor potatoes and earned his team's ire by trying to give unwanted help, but the men did well on entrees thanks to Benjamin's strong performance on meat. Jason was slow on garnish, but recovered. In the women's kitchen, Maria needed Nilka's help to get risottos out, Fran struggled on meat and Ramsay eventually forced her to see a medic, while Jamie burned carrots and mashed potatoes. Siobhan took over, but lost track of her work on fish in the process; both teams completed service. Ramsay named the men the winners, praising Benjamin. Elimination: Fran and Jamie were nominated. Ramsay eliminated Jamie for being a consistently poor performer and surrendering control of the garnish station to Siobhan. Jamie's comment: "Words can't describe how pissed off I am right now. I don't think Chef Ramsay made the right decision. I am, by far, a better cook than Fran is. And I expected to be here a lot longer than what it was." Ramsay's comment: "To be a great chef, you need creativity, leadership qualities, and passion. Jamie had passion."
82	4	"12 Chefs Compete Part 1"	June 15, 2010	6.52
After the elimination, Ramsay pulled Salvatore aside and encouraged him to fight back after his poor performance. Before the next challenge, Scott and Salvatore sat down together to go over the recipes. Team challenge: Each chef rolled a die with letters on each side of it, then having ten seconds to call out an ingredient starting with that letter. (Note: Scott rolled H and went for Halibut, Jason rolled E and went for endive, Ed rolled S and went for salsify, Benjamin rolled C and went for crab, Jay rolled P and went for peas and Salvatore rolled B and went for bacon. For the women, Fran rolled B and went for beets, Nilka rolled S and went for shallots, Autumn rolled M and went for mangoes, Siobhan rolled H and went for ham, Maria rolled T and went for turnips and Holli rolled D and went with duck.) The teams then had 30 minutes to create a dish using those ingredients. The men made a pan roasted halibut with a bacon, pea and crab ragu, a salsify puree and a salad of crab and endive, while the women made a mango glazed pan seared duck with ham, pureed turnips and beets. The men won after the women's duck was cooked with too much "fat" left on. Reward/punishment: The men were told they were going skydiving, which Jason was uncomfortable with at first, but they soon learned they were going to be in a vertical wind tunnel at I-Fly for the day. The women cleaned the entryway to Hell's Kitchen and prepped both kitchens for service. During the punishment, Maria had a meltdown, but Sous Chef Andi gave her a pep talk to calm her down. Service: Service included numerous celebrities as well as special guests on the chef's tables. The men's special guests were Debi Mazar and her husband, Italian chef Gabriele Corcos, while the women's special guests were Kevin Frazier and his wife. Also in attendance was Carrie Preston. In the men's kitchen, appetizers ran smoothly thanks to Jason (with Scott attempting to provide some unwanted help to him), with the only problem being Salvatore serving raw snapper, but he recovered and managed to have a strong performance on fish for the rest of service. On entrees, Ed served hard potatoes, and Scott served undercooked steak and then raw wellingtons. Despite these problems, Scott managed to recover and the men were able to successfully complete service. In the women's kitchen, Siobhan twice failed to realize that lobster was mistakenly labeled as crab and thus served a crab capellini with lobster, but after that, appetizers ran smoothly. On entrees, Nilka was strong on meat, with the only problem being Autumn dropping a piece of salmon onto one of her burners; Ramsay scolded her for acting casual about it. Ramsay considered the service to be an improvement and named both teams winners, though he had each team nominate one chef for elimination. Nilka and Salvatore were named Best of the Best on their teams and were asked to choose the nominees. Team change: Nilka nominated Autumn, while Salvatore nominated Scott. No one was eliminated, but Ramsay substituted Autumn to the men's team and Scott to the women's team. Ramsay's comment: "After our best service yet, I've decided to give Autumn and Scott another chance. But they better excel, or they'll both be gone."
83	5	"12 Chefs Compete Part 2"	June 22, 2010	5.94
Team challenge: Each chef brought a pig in a pen to get an ingredient listed on the pigs collar, totaling three pork items and three side items. The teams then had to create three dishes, each with pork as the primary ingredient and one further ingredient. The red team got ham hock, tenderloin, blood sausage, apple, prunes and sweet potato, while the blue team got bacon, pork chop, loin chop, cabbage, pinto beans and bok choi. The blue team's roasted pork loin scored over the red team's blood sausage and prunes, but the red team's fennel-encrusted pork tenderloin scored over the blue team's honey-glazed bacon. Finally, Jay and Salvatore's pork chop with pinto beans scored over Maria and Scott's sweet potato soup as the soup used ham hock as a garnish, when it was supposed to be the main ingredient. Reward/punishment: The blue team were rewarded with a trip to Glen Ivy Hot Springs Spa while the red team had to give the pigs baths. Service: Ramsay announced that that night's service will be barbecue night with the service having two shifts, with the teams taking turns cooking and working in the dining room. In the red kitchen, Fran had a strong performance on appetizers, but Maria served raw crab and fell behind on the refire and argued with Holli, who told her to pick up the pace. The entire team struggled with communication, eventually arguing with one another mid-service, which was only made worse by them doing it while Ramsay was calling out a ticket. Scott overcooked fried chicken and was berated for leaving his oven door open, which was a safety hazard. The blue team did well in the dining room, with their only problem being Salvatore's poor handwriting, which Ramsay forgave him for after he revealed he never went to school. Autumn took the chance to send as many dishes back to the red kitchen as she could, including some of Siobhan's burgers which were undercooked. After Siobhan served another undercooked burger, Ramsay angrily smashed it against the counter and ended service as their time limit was up. When the teams swapped, the red team were slow to get orders to the kitchen, while Maria also took orders from Holli's section. Jay was strong on appetizers, but had to refire some due to Maria writing some of the orders incorrectly. Salvatore struggled to communicate on garnish. Autumn also undercooked ribs, and Ramsay criticized her for working and moving slowly. In addition, Jason was confronted aggressively for frying chicken and fries in the same basket. Ramsay ended service after Jason revealed he was three minutes away on a ticket, with their time limit having expired. Ramsay named the blue team winners for their performance in the dining room; Fran was named best of the worst. Elimination: After receiving advice from Scott, Fran nominated Maria and Nilka, but Nilka's nomination backfired after Ramsay nominated Scott. Ramsay ultimately eliminated Maria for being the worst performer of the night (he was also unimpressed with her attitude, believing she "lacked commitment to the industry"). Maria's comment: "I really didn't show the heart. I didn't show all of my capabilities. But, based on performance alone, Scott had a worse service than me - plain and simple." Ramsay's comment: "Maria was in over her head. On garnish, she was lost and her team paid the cost. That's why her life in Hell's Kitchen is dead."
84	6	"11 Chefs Compete"	June 22, 2010	6.38
Team Challenge: The challenge was to make meals out of five mother sauces while not reusing any of the other twenty ingredients given to them. The blue team worked well together, but on the red team, Nilka, still angry over getting nominated last night, took most of the ingredients without consulting her teammates. To judge the dishes, Ramsay called on the help of his wife and mother. Fran scored over Salvatore on tomato sauce, as his pasta was undercooked. Neither Jay nor Siobhan scored on hollandaise. Siobhan misidentified her pigeon as a cornish hen and thus severely undercooked it, while Jay's duck and peas were also undercooked and his sauce was bland. Ed and Autumn (who worked together with an extra member on the blue team) scored on velouté over Holli, who mistakenly identified her sea bass as halibut when presenting. Nilka scored over Jason on demi-glace and Benjamin scored over Scott on béchamel, leaving the score tied at two. Ultimately, Ramsay gave the blue team the win, judging Jason's dish to be the best of the dishes not awarded a point. Reward/punishment: Ramsay treated the blue team to lunch and darts at Ye Olde King's Head British Pub in Santa Monica and each chef received a set of premium pots and pans from Demeyere Cookware. The red team cleaned and prepped both kitchens. During the punishment, Siobhan suffered a mild allergic reaction from the cleaning supply, and was excused from cleaning the kitchens, though she did return to help prep. Service: Hell's Kitchen hosted family night, with a kids menu included. The blue team had a strong performance; their only problems were Salvatore adding fresh rice to risotto when he forgot an extra portion and getting berated for lying to Ramsay about it, and Jason not informing Ramsay that he had to put an order of chicken back in the oven due to undercooking it. Under Benjamin's strong leadership, the blue team completed service. The red team struggled throughout dinner service. Siobhan didn't know she was supposed to be cooking the children's spaghetti and then attempted to cook it in cold pasta water. Nilka forgot to add lobster to a risotto and cursed loud enough for the children to hear while Fran overcooked scallops, but after that, appetizers ran smoothly. However, on entrees, Scott only fired one steak with two on order and blamed his team for it, causing a lengthy delay. He then served raw wellingtons which earned him a trip to the storeroom with Ramsay. Ramsay kicked the entire team out when Scott undercooked chicken and steak again. He, Sous Chef Scott, and Sous Chef Andi completed their service. Ramsay named the blue team clear winners. Elimination: Scott and Fran were nominated, but Fran thought Siobhan should have been nominated, so Ramsay called all three forward. Much to the red team's relief, Ramsay eliminated Scott for his arrogance and failing to live up to his executive chef position, saying that after six services he couldn't wait any longer for Scott to back up his talk. Scott's comment: "I certainly am the best cook on the red team, but when you're working with teammates that aren't as qualified to be there as you are, it makes it hard. But at the end of the day, I'm still gonna go on and continue to be a great chef." Team change: Following Scott's elimination, Ramsay transferred Benjamin to the red team, believing that the red team sorely lacked leadership, and told Benjamin to make it better. Ramsay's comment: "If Scott could cook as well as he talks, he'd be the winner of Hell's Kitchen. Unfortunately for him, he can't."
85	7	"10 Chefs Compete"	June 29, 2010	6.00
Team challenge: Both teams cooked meals for a 50th wedding anniversary, remaking three dishes that the wedding couple had at their wedding reception 50 years ago (Steak Diane, Chicken Kiev, and Trout Almondine). The blue team scored on Steak Diane, as Nilka didn't even know what Steak Diane was and thus made a dish that tasted too much of alcohol. The red team easily scored over blue team on chicken kiev as they had taken Salvatore's bizarre idea of making chicken meatballs and, if that wasn't bad enough, Salvatore had undercooked both of the meatballs. The trout almondine dish ended in a tie as the husband and wife preferred different dishes, but Ramsay broke the tie in favor of the red team. Reward/punishment: The red team were rewarded with dinner and dancing at Frisco's Carhops, a 1950s-style diner and got to serve the guests of honor during service. The blue team had to decorate the dining room for the 50th-anniversary reception, including constructing the dance floor. Service: Ed and Nilka served Steak Diane tableside. In the blue kitchen, the cake made almost fell over but was saved in time. The blue team had another strong service, with the only problem being Salvatore struggling on garnish throughout the night as he did not communicate with his teammates or Ramsay and repeatedly forgot garnishes for tables while at the same time bringing up the wrong amounts. The red kitchen was able to complete their service with few flaws. Appetizers ran well with the only problems being Siobhan being slow with the caesar salads, while Benjamin served raw and then overcooked crab cakes and rudely rejected Nilka's help. However, both managed to quickly recover. On entrees, Holli overcooked duck and served raw chicken, and Fran was berated for bringing garnish to the pass in a hot pan rather than draining it, which was a safety hazard. Although both kitchens completed service, Ramsay named the blue team winners for having less problems throughout the night. Elimination: While initially considering Holli and Fran, the team, after Benjamin's prodding, ultimately nominated Fran and Siobhan. However, Ramsay spared them due to the red team's improved performance and eliminated Salvatore for being a consistently poor performer and lack of improvement over seven services, making him the second chef to leave the competition despite being on the winning team. Salvatore's comment: "You mess up, you pay the consequences. Yeah, I'm mad that I left, but at the same time, you know, I messed up two, three times in a row, so I deserve to went home. And it was the right decision. Grazie a tutti. Ciao." (Thank you everybody. Goodbye.) Ramsay's comment: "Salvatore had a big heart. Too bad he couldn't cook with it."
86	8	"9 Chefs Compete"	June 29, 2010	6.39
Team Challenge: Each chef made a gourmet sandwich in 30 minutes. Because the red team had one more chef, they had to choose one sandwich to sit out, choosing Siobhan. The score ended in a 3-3 tie, so Ramsay used Siobhan's sandwich to declare a winner. Ramsay awarded the blue team the win, preferring Siobhan's sandwich over Fran's. Reward/punishment: The blue team flew to the California Central Wine Country with Ramsay, where they went wine tasting, while the red team had to shell peanuts and grind them into peanut butter. The entire blue team got drunk from the reward and were hungover before service, most notably Ed and Autumn. Service: In the red kitchen, Fran undercooked the risotto, despite cooking the first one perfectly, while Siobhan burned scallops. Afterwards, Ramsay found a huge pile of discarded scallops on her station, and Siobhan argued that she thought some of them looked good. As a result, Ramsay forced her to go out into the dining room and eat them, allowing Benjamin to take over. After Siobhan returned, Benjamin refused to let her back on the fish station and relegated her to desserts. Nilka then served raw chicken and after Fran underdressed salad and undercooked risotto, Ramsay threw the red team out. The blue team struggled with communication throughout the night as a result of being hung over. Jason served overcooked scallops and Jay served a bland and undercooked risotto, but both managed to recover and get appetizers out. However, Autumn didn't communicate with Ed on meat, falling behind on mashed potatoes before serving them too salty. After Ed served raw duck, a fed-up Ramsay threw the blue team out; both teams were named joint losers. This was the only service all season where both teams were thrown out. Elimination: The blue team nominated Autumn and Ed while the red team nominated Siobhan and Fran. After hearing from the other three nominees, Ramsay eliminated Siobhan on the spot for her inconsistent performances and her lack of confidence. In particular, he felt that allowing Benjamin to take over her station justified her elimination regardless of what she intended to say in her defense. However, he praised her for her hard work before she left. Siobhan's comment: "I'm definitely leaving Hell's Kitchen with a lot of confidence, and I'm very proud to at least have gotten this far. It would be nice to run the Savoy Grill, but to take this experience and to learn so much from it is priceless. All in all, I stayed professional, I stayed true to myself, and I was brave and fearless the entire way through." Ramsay's comment: "Siobhan got pushed around a lot in Hell's Kitchen. So it was up to me to finally push her out."
87	9	"8 Chefs Compete"	July 6, 2010	6.60
Team challenge: The contestants conducted a blind taste test to see which foods they can correctly identify. The blue team won 4-3, with Jay being the only contestant to correctly identify two ingredients, while Fran and Ed got none correct. Reward/punishment: The blue team were rewarded with VIP passes to SeaWorld San Diego to swim with dolphins and spend the day at the park. The red team took in several deliveries of food, one of which was meant to go to London West Hollywood, not Hell's Kitchen. Service: Each team prepared their own menu consisting of four appetizers, entrees and desserts, with the customers deciding which menu to order from. Ramsay was not impressed with either menu, branding the red team's menu (mostly Benjamin's ideas) uninspiring, but was impressed with Holli's desserts. Ramsay hated the blue team's menu, finding it very simplistic which the blue team had aimed for in order to make it easy to execute. The blue team decided to revamp their menu at the last minute, but the red team ignored Ramsay's suggestions. As a result, the orders for the blue team's menu vastly outnumbered those of the red team. There were relatively few problems on appetizers save for Ed slicing duck too early and Benjamin rejecting Nilka's help with plating and having an undercooked pasta dish returned. Both kitchens saw poor performances on meat. For the red team, Fran undercooked chicken and steak, while blaming her teammates for not communicating with her when to fire the meat. Holli was berated for waiting for Nilka on garnish while walking to the pass, and Nilka boiled asparagus that was meant to be grilled. In the blue kitchen, Autumn served raw pork twice, and Ramsay forced her to apologize to the customer. When she took too long on a steak, Jay kicked her off the station for Ed, and put her on desserts instead. Ramsay named both teams losers for coming up with poor menus and not executing them particularly well, and had them each nominate one chef for elimination. Elimination: The blue team nominated Autumn and the red team nominated Fran. Ramsay had both Autumn and Fran remove their jackets, then eliminated Fran, feeling that she had gone as far as she could, but commended her for her determination. Fran's comment: "I don't regret one minute that I have spent here. I truly was the backbone of the team. They all think that the red team is stronger with me gone. The red team, they don't realize what they've lost right now." Team change: As for Autumn, Ramsay tells her that being on the blue team is only making her worse, and transfers her back to the red team, while noting that even though the red team didn't like her, she did have better performances there. This marks the first time a chef was sent back to their original team, not counting Jen Gavin and Matt Bloch from Season 4 who were sent back to their original teams only to receive black jackets shortly after. Ramsay's comment: "Fran wanted her team to communicate, but it seems the only thing her team agreed on was wanting her gone."
88	10	"7 Chefs Compete"	July 6, 2010	7.20
Team Challenge: The contestants each cooked a lobster dish with a 10-pound lobster, with three Michelin-starred chefs judging. As the red team had an extra chef, they chose Nilka's dish to sit out. Only one chef from each team earned a point: Holli and Jason. Ramsay deemed Holli's dish the best dish, giving the red team the win. Reward/punishment: The red team were treated to sampling caviar at Petrossian Paris, and were each given $1000 for a shopping spree at Kitson. The blue team cleaned the dorms and prepped both kitchens for service. However, when the red team returned, the blue team had still not prepped their own kitchen. For the first time, Ramsay decided that both teams would operate together in the red kitchen and that there would be a two-and-a-half-hour time limit for service to serve customers who would then be attending the theater. Service: For winning the challenge, Holli served caviar tableside. Nilka continually struggled on fish throughout service. She first undercooked scallops twice on the first table of appetizers, earning a warning from Ramsay, and then was slow to serve turbot for one table. She then served it undercooked and dropped it on the ground after Ramsay gave it back. Ramsay had wanted her to put it back in the pan, and berated her for giving up. Things didn't get better for her on entrees; despite Jason having a strong performance on meat, Nilka nearly dropped her lobster after taking it out the oven and then earned a trip to the pantry with Ramsay after she brought up the wrong sauce with it. Ramsay sternly warned her that she needed to bounce back and was on her last chance. Despite Jay trying to help her, her next attempt was raw, prompting Ramsay to eliminate her mid-service. The team then completed the rest of their tables in the time limit nearly trouble free, with the only problem being Ed momentarily getting distracted and having some pans of garnish catch fire. Automatic elimination: Despite Nilka receiving a stern warning from Ramsay to bounce back, she repeatedly served raw seafood, causing him to lose his patience and eliminate her on the spot. Nilka then returned to the kitchen and begged Ramsay to give her one more chance, refusing to leave until he forced Benjamin to help him get her out. Both teams rallied and finished the service with fifteen minutes to spare. Ramsay then met with Nilka at the back entrance after service and, despite telling her she was not ready for the head chef's job, calmly urged her not to give up on her dream and commended her previous performances before taking her jacket and sending her home via taxi. Nilka received the picture-burning and coat-hanging sequence at the end of the episode (she is also the last chef to be ejected and exit through the back entrance, because Michael Gabriel from season 12 was ejected and exited through the front entrance). Nilka's comment: "It hurts to get kicked out of here like this. It really, really does. I don't want to take my jacket off. And it just pisses me off that it went down like this. It really, really did. It really, really did. And I don't want to go home. I don't want to go home. I don't. I came here for a reason." Elimination: Despite both teams being named joint-winners, they were each told to nominate one chef for elimination. Though Autumn and Ed were nominated, Ramsay gave everyone a black jacket after having already eliminated Nilka. Ramsay's comment: "Tonight was the best service we've had in Hell's Kitchen, and that's why I rewarded the final six. Now, only the best chefs remain. Nilka was clearly out of her depth."
89	11	"6 Chefs Compete"	July 20, 2010	6.07
Individual challenge: In an individual challenge, the chefs had thirty minutes to create a great-tasting dish and make it look aesthetically pleasing. The dishes were judged on presentation by culinary students. From worst to best, the dishes were Holli, Jay, Jason and Autumn. Benjamin and Ed's dishes were singled out as the top two. The dishes were then judged by Tanya Steel of Epicurious on taste, who named Benjamin the winner. Reward/punishment: Benjamin received a makeover and photo shoot with Epicurious, as well as his dish being featured at the next dinner service, while the others cleaned the restaurant. Prior to service, the rest of the chefs expressed concern over Benjamin's over-complicated dish from the challenge, which was on the menu that night. Service: Whoopi Goldberg was a special guest at the chef's table. On appetizers, Ed undercooked scallops and John Dory and got overwhelmed on the fish station due to the large number of halibut on order (Benjamin's challenge winning dish). Jason served a bland capellini but managed to recover. Autumn attempted to help Benjamin on the meat station, but Benjamin became non responsive to her and the rest of the kitchen and rudely rejected her help, causing Ramsay to berate him. Because of this, he slipped and dropped a chicken. Ed then repeatably undercooked halibut, which, due to the amount of garnish on the dish, caused Jay to fall behind on garnish. After Ed started to again get overwhelmed with the halibut, eventually breaking one, Benjamin jumped in to help, but they undercooked another halibut. At this point, nearly everyone started cooking halibut on their respective stations, causing such chaos that no one could remember what was on order. After Benjamin brought up cold steak, Ramsay berated him for not communicating with the rest of his team. Ramsay eventually kicked out Ed for overcooking scallops and Benjamin for bringing up meat for the wrong table, while the remaining four completed service. Elimination: It appeared that Benjamin and Ed would be the two nominees, however, when Ramsay told the team to decide on two nominees based on "overall" performance, Autumn and Ed were nominated. Ramsay eliminated Ed for his huge downward spiral, disintegrating performances and unconvincing final plea. Ed's comment: "It's disappointing, but I don't have any regrets. I had a great time here. The hardest part about being here is standing up for yourself, building self-confidence, not wanting to give up. Sometimes, actions speak better than words. Apparently, my actions tonight weren't too good. I guess it's kind of easy when you got 15 others, but when you got only five others and you mess up, you really stand out." Ramsay's comment: "Ed was one of the favorites because of his strong start. Unfortunately, in cooking, it's not how you start, it's how you finish."
90	12	"5 Chefs Compete"	July 20, 2010	6.98
Individual challenge: The contestants went to Owen's, a local supermarket, where they were each given $10 to spend in ten minutes on ingredients for their dish, which they had 30 minutes to cook. Each dish was judged by a panel of three gourmands, who then come up with a price they would pay if they ordered this dish; the contestant with the largest average price won. Jason's tilapia dish ($16.00) ended up in last because he bought prepared ravioli. Benjamin's ratatouille dish ($25.00) was fourth, Autumn's veal dish ($27.33) was third, Jay's lamb dish ($28.66) was second and Holli finished in first with her tuna dish ($29.66). Reward/punishment: Holli chose Jay, as the challenge runner-up, to join her and Jean-Philippe at The Peninsula Beverly Hills for a poolside lunch, followed by a $1000 kitchen equipment shopping spree at Surfas. Holli's dish was also featured in that night's service. The others did laundry and had Spam sandwiches for lunch. Service: Ramsay had the contestants switch stations every several minutes to test their communication skills, in which each chef told the contestant replacing them what to do before moving on. The service was very rocky; Jay overcooked John Dory and Wellingtons and could not give a time for the refires; Benjamin held up Jason on garnish, overcooked tuna, and tried to take over scallops from Holli before undercooking them; and Jason overcooked scallops and halibut. At one point, Ramsay stepped out, leaving Sous Chef Scott in charge. Benjamin attempted to read orders at the pass, only to be berated by Scott. The team completed service, but Ramsay was far from impressed and had the team nominate two for elimination. Elimination: Jason and Benjamin were nominated. Despite criticizing Benjamin for his poor communication and having his worst performance, Ramsay eliminated Jason for his lack of leadership compared to the other chefs, but gave him encouragement. Jason's comment: "I'm proud of myself. From the first dinner service up until my last dinner service, I elevated every time. Being here this long has made me truly a better chef, a better person, and a better leader. I know something else is out there for me, and being here was probably the catapult for that thing to happen. But I loved the experience, it was great, once in a lifetime. Ups and downs, highs and lows. It was wonderful, but I'd never do this shit again." Ramsay's comment: "Jason was good enough to make it to the final five, but he just didn't instill the confidence I needed to see to be my head chef."
91	13	"4 Chefs Compete Part 1"	July 27, 2010	6.40
Individual challenge: Ramsay showed the chefs how to cook monkfish before having them verbally teach beginners how to duplicate Ramsay's dish. Jay won the challenge. Reward/punishment: Jay chose Holli to come with him on an aerial tour of Los Angeles on the Goodyear Blimp. Benjamin and Autumn did maintenance and cleaning around the Hell's Kitchen complex. During the blimp ride, Jay and Holli flew over Hell's Kitchen and taunted Benjamin and Autumn on the blimp's digital display, saying, "Losers, hope you're enjoying your punishment!". Service: For the first time in Hell's Kitchen history, the contestants chose which station they would work. Holli undercooked John Dory, Jay served bland risotto, Autumn undercooked scallops, and Benjamin caused a beef wellington to split and had a lack of communication. However, all four chefs finished service, with Jay being named Best of the Best. Elimination: Jay nominated Autumn and Benjamin. (Note: Autumn's nomination ties her with Sabrina Brimhall from season 8, Elise Wims from season 9, Clemenza Caserta from season 10 and Scott Commings from season 12 as the most nominated contestant in the history of the show, at seven nominations.) Ramsay called Autumn and then Benjamin forward, only to order them back in line. After a great service, Ramsay decided it was impossible to send anyone home. Instead, he invited each of the contestant's family members to Hell's Kitchen for a brief visit (Benjamin's wife and daughter, Holli's son and best friend, Jay's mother and stepfather, and Autumn's best friend and boyfriend). Ramsay's comment: "I decided to let all the chefs enjoy tonight's successful dinner service, but what they don't know is, after the next dinner service, I'll be cutting the field in half."
92	14	"4 Chefs Compete Part 2"	August 3, 2010	7.15
Individual challenge: Ramsay presented a dish and had the chefs taste it. In a "taste it, make it" challenge, they then had to recreate the dish in 45 minutes without knowing the ingredients. Jay came in last place despite getting both the puree (pear) and the garnish (pancetta) correct, as he used flank steak as the main protein when it was actually venison. Autumn was also disqualified for using bacon instead of pancetta. After Ramsay tasted the other two dishes again, he awarded Holli the win. Reward/punishment: Holli and her family went out to sea on a luxury yacht, while the others cleaned the dorms. Benjamin complained of lower back and shoulder pains and initially decided to leave the competition, but stayed after talking to Ramsay. Service: Ramsay gave each of the chefs an opportunity to run the hot pass. During the chefs' time on the pass, they had to complete quality control checks, including Sous Chef Scott sabotaging the food and Jean-Philippe leaving out an entree from an order. Jay had a very strong start, catching lobster instead of crab in a capellini and vice versa in a risotto. Holli had a nervous start and failed to notice a ticket with the wrong number of entrees, but recovered to send back an order of scallops only cooked on one side. Benjamin did not notice he had been given venison wellingtons rather than lamb wellingtons, but proved to be a strong leader and caught a New York strip in place of filet mignon. Autumn caught Jean-Philippe's ticket mistake, but failed to notice she had been given the wrong sauce and then angered Ramsay by not taking the mistake seriously. She then became excessively nitpicky and started sending back dishes which the other chefs and even Scott thought were cooked correctly. Elimination: Instead of asking the chefs who should be nominated for elimination, Ramsay told the chefs to each say why they should advance to the final. Autumn was the first chef to be eliminated, but Ramsay commended her for her passion and dedication. Ramsay then chose Jay and Holli to advance to the final, eliminating Benjamin, though Ramsay encouraged Benjamin to never give up. And Benjamin must return jacket to Gordon Ramsay. Autumn's comment: "I'm happy to have made it this far. I was able to overcome obstacles I didn't know that I had the strength in me to do. I got stronger and stronger, and I never gave up. Every elimination, I was being told by my teammates I wasn't passionate, I wasn't a team player. And I proved everyone wrong, and I'm really proud of myself for that." Benjamin's comment: "Being in Hell's Kitchen makes you appreciate every moment. I gave it all, and either I was gonna show off or I was gonna go down in flames because I was pushing it. The time that I've spent in Hell's Kitchen has definitely reconnected my passion. There's no way I can go back to teaching."
93	15	"2 Chefs Compete"	August 10, 2010	7.24
Individual challenge: Holli and Jay traveled by limo to London West Hollywood where, to a crowd of fans, they had one hour to cook five dishes: an Amuse-bouche, a cold appetizer, a hot appetizer, a fish course and a meat course, to be judged by five chefs from Ramsay's restaurants in England. Jay won 3-2. Reward: Jay was granted the first pick in drafting a team using the six chefs eliminated prior to the final. (Note: Ed did not return, so Siobhan took his place as the last person to be eliminated prior to final eight.) Jay picked Benjamin, Jason, and Fran, while Holli picked Autumn and Nilka, and was left with Siobhan. Service: Among the customers were Holli and Jay's relatives and friends. In Holli's kitchen, Siobhan got stalled on amuse-bouches and struggled on garnish. Nilka served overcooked venison, and Autumn fell behind on garnish and refused to take help from her team as she believed that they had no idea what they were doing. In Jay's kitchen, Fran burned scallops and got overwhelmed, Jason served raw lamb and had some meat returned for being poorly sliced, and Ramsay noted that Benjamin appeared to be leading more than Jay, warning Jay to step up and run the kitchen. Both teams eventually rallied and finished service. Winner: The winner was then determined by Ramsay, based on comments of the diners and his own observations. Holli and Jay stood in front of a closed door; Holli's door opened, making her the seventh winner of Hell's Kitchen; Jay took his defeat graciously. Jay's comment: "I'm not psyched about losing, but it was very close, and Holli did a great job and deserved to win." Holli's comment: "I'm so excited! It's crazy! Jay is a great person, and if it wasn't me against him, I would hope he would win because I think he deserves to win. Jay rocks. I missed my son so much. Because we hug, and he's, like, 'Mama, you're the best chef ever.' When he looks back, he's gonna be proud. And that feels good. He's my little man, he's my little chef." Ramsay's comment: "Holli won because she has grown as a chef more than any other chef in Hell's Kitchen. At the start, she was barely noticeable. But then she got her confidence. She emerged, and there was no holding her back. I'm absolutely thrilled she'll be working with me at the Savoy Grill in London." (Note: Because winner Holli chose not to work in London due to Visa problems moments after the season ended, she decided to keep her cash prize.)
