= Hell's Kitchen (American TV series) season 8 =

Hell's Kitchen
- Season 8
- Promotional poster for season 8, featuring host Ramsay
- Hosted by: Gordon Ramsay
- No. of contestants: 16
- Winner: Nona Sivley
- Runner-up: Russell Kook II
- No. of episodes: 15

Release
- Original network: Fox
- Original release: September 22 – December 15, 2010

Season chronology
- ← Previous; Season 7 Next → Season 9

The eighth season of Hell's Kitchen, an American reality competition television series starring Gordon Ramsay, premiered on Fox on September 22, 2010, and concluded on December 15, 2010. Gordon Ramsay returned as host and head chef, while Scott Leibfried returned as the Blue Team's sous-chef and Andi Van Willigan returned as the Red Team's sous-chef. James Lukanik debuted as maître d', replacing Jean-Philippe Susilovic, who had been serving as director at Ramsay's London restaurant Pétrus. This would be the last season to feature 16 contestants, until season 17.

The season was won by sous chef Nona Sivley, with sous chef Russell Kook finishing second. In addition to the head chef position at the prize restaurant, Nona received the opportunity to become a spokesperson for Rosemount Estate Wines.

== Contestants ==
Sixteen chefs competed in season eight.

Contestant	Age (at time of filming)	Occupation	Hometown	Result
Nona Sivley	29	Sous Chef	Atlanta, Georgia	Winner
Russell Kook II	29	Sous Chef	Madison, Wisconsin	Runner-Up
Jillian Flathers	28	Sous Chef	Pagosa Springs, Colorado	Eliminated before Finals
Trevor "Trev" McGrath (Note: Chef returned to Hell's Kitchen again on Season 18, finished at 7th place.)	30	Line Cook/Bartender	Chicago, Illinois	Eliminated before Finals
Gail Novenario	28	Executive Chef	San Francisco, California	Eliminated after Twelfth Service
Sabrina Brimhall	22	Prep Chef	Moreno Valley, California	Eliminated after Eleventh Service
Vincenzo "Vinny" Accardi	29	Line Cook	Queens, New York	Eliminated after Tenth Service
Rob McCue	36	Law Firm Chef	Massapequa, New York	Eliminated after Ninth Service
Boris Poleschuk	38	Catering Chef	Manalapan, New Jersey	Eliminated after Eighth Service
Melissa Doney	31	Executive Sous Chef	Albany, New York	Eliminated after Sixth Service
Emily Kutchins	29	Senior Home Executive Chef	Chicago, Illinois	Eliminated after Fifth Service
Louis Repucci	28	Children's Camp Chef	Diamond Bar, California	Eliminated after Fourth Service
Ranjit "Raj" Brandston	49	Personal Chef	Queens, New York	Eliminated after Third Service
Lewis Curtis	26	Executive Chef	Beebe, Arkansas	Eliminated after Second Service
Lisa LaFranca	48	Corporate Food Director	Brooklyn, New York	Eliminated after First Service
Antonia Boregman	40	Line Cook/Beautician	Chicago, Illinois	Hospitalized before First Service

== Contestant progress ==
No.	Chef	Original teams					1st switch			2nd switch		Individuals				Finals
No.	Chef	801	802	803	804	805	806	807	808	809	810	811	812	813	814	815
1	Nona	LOSE	WIN	LOSE	LOSE	LOSE	NOM	NOM	WIN	WIN	LOSE	IN	IN	IN	IN	WINNER
2	Russell	LOSE	LOSE	WIN	LOSE	WIN	LOSE	WIN	LOSE	NOM	LOSE	IN	IN	NOM	IN	RUNNER-UP
3	Jillian	LOSE	WIN	LOSE	LOSE	LOSE	LOSE	WIN	WIN	WIN	LOSE	IN	IN	IN	OUT	Russell's team
4	Trev	NOM	LOSE	WIN	LOSE	WIN	LOSE	WIN	WIN	BoW	NOM (Note: Trevor voided the nomination despite being the most voted for elimination)	NOM	NOM	NOM	OUT	Nona's team
5	Gail	LOSE	WIN	LOSE	LOSE	LOSE	LOSE	WIN	WIN	WIN	NOM	IN	OUT			Nona's team
6	Sabrina	NOM	WIN	NOM	NOM	BoW	NOM	NOM	WIN	WIN	NOM (Note: Sabrina voided the nomination despite being voted for elimination)	OUT				Russell's team
7	Vinny	LOSE	NOM	WIN	LOSE	WIN	LOSE	WIN	NOM	LOSE	OUT					Russell's team
8	Rob	LOSE	LOSE	WIN	LOSE	WIN	LOSE	NOM	NOM	OUT						Russell's team
9	Boris	LOSE	NOM	WIN	NOM	WIN	NOM	NOM	OUT							Nona's team
10	Melissa	LOSE	WIN	LOSE	NOM	NOM	OUT									Nona's team
11	Emily	LOSE	WIN	NOM	LOSE	OUT										
12	Louis	LOSE	LOSE	WIN	OUT											
13	Raj	NOM	NOM	OUT												
14	Curtis	LOSE	OUT													
15	Lisa	OUT														
16	Antonia	HOSP														

Keywords

- WIN = Won the dinner service
- LOSE = Lost the dinner service
- BoB = Best of the Best, usually exempt from nomination
- BoW = Best of the Worst, sometimes exempt from nomination
- IN = not nominated for elimination
- NOM = nominated for elimination
- OUT = eliminated normally
- LEFT = withdrew from competition
- HOSP = eliminated due to hospitalization
- EJEC = eliminated during service

Color key
Chef was eliminated after regular nomination
Chef was eliminated after Ramsay's nomination
Chef was eliminated without nomination
Chef was eliminated from winning team
Chef was eliminated in the Cook For Your Life challenge
Chef was nominated to participate in the Cook For Your Life challenge
Chef was eliminated during service
Chef withdrew from the competition
Chef was the Best of the Best/Worst
Chef was retained after regular nomination
Chef was retained after Ramsay's nomination
Chef's nomination was voided
The winner of Hell's Kitchen
The runner-up of Hell's Kitchen

== Episodes ==
No. overall	No. in season	Title	Original release date	U.S. viewers (millions)	Recap
94	1	"16 Chefs Compete"	September 22, 2010	5.98	
Sixteen chefs arrived at Hell's Kitchen, only to find the doors locked. They were then greeted by James, the new maître d', who gave them blindfolds to wear before having them transported to the JW Marriott Hotel at L.A. Live to meet chef Ramsay, who revealed that this season's winner would become the head chef at the L.A. Market restaurant. The chefs were then returned to Hell's Kitchen to make their signature dishes. Team challenge/signature dish: Emily's duck breast, Russell's grilled calamari steak, Vinny's boiled and poached halibut, Jillian's herb and vegetable stuffed chicken, Boris' dish, and Sabrina's baqueta fish with blood orange fennel salad all received a point (though Sabrina was threatened with an on-the-spot elimination for yawning and having a poor attitude). Raj's seafood and vegetable pancake was tasty, but it looked nothing like an actual pancake and was oily. The remaining dishes were poorly received; Nona's honey fried chicken was spat out as it was too sweet and her asparagus was raw, while Antonia's Mardi Gras gumbo made Ramsay physically ill and vomit twice, and the latter had the rest of the chefs taste it. Curtis' lemon pepper chicken was described as "shit", Rob's pistachio-crusted rack of lamb was undercooked and poorly cut, Gail's potatoes were burnt, Trev's steak was deemed an "embarrassment", Lisa's pork chop was overly dry, Louis' lobster meat was stuck inside the shell, and Melissa was asked if she was "off her tiny mind" when she presented her steak. The challenge ended in a three-three tie, and Ramsay named Antonia's dish the worst, giving the men the win. Reward/punishment: The men received massages on the patio, while the women cleaned both kitchens. Antonia's exit: Shortly before dinner service, Antonia suffered a migraine and collapsed. She was rushed to the hospital and would not return to the competition. Neither Antonia nor Ramsay commented on her departure. Her jacket and burnt photo could be seen twice when the latter hung up Rob's and Vinny's jackets. Service: Grammy Award-winning guitarist Michelle Branch and TV host Donald Schultz were guests for opening night, which featured a special mini-pizza menu. Emily and Raj took orders in the dining room, but Raj was criticized for not writing down orders and talking to the customers at the same time. He struggled as a server and was later asked to help his team or "fuck off". However, Raj and Boris couldn't make a single pizza as the former refused to listen to the latter's instructions. Trev sent up multiple overdressed salads, and Ramsay threw one of them on the ground, smashing the plate. In the women's kitchen, Melissa served a raw pizza, which Boris mimicked Ramsay criticizing her for. Ramsay overheard Boris, pulled him into the women's kitchen to touch the pizza, and sternly threatened him with automatic elimination should he do it again. Lisa worked slowly on fish, constantly flipping her scallops in a pan that wasn't hot enough, and serving a raw halibut. Sabrina refused to listen to her team, bringing the meat entrees to the pass too early, and was berated. Several tables walked out, causing Ramsay to berate the chefs and shut down the kitchens. He refused to name a winner, calling it the worst-ever opening service, marking the first time in Hell's Kitchen history both teams lost the first service. Elimination: The men nominated Raj and Trev while the women nominated Lisa and Sabrina. Although he considered Sabrina for her selfish attitude, Ramsay sent her back in line followed by Trev before eliminating Lisa for her abysmal performance on fish, feeling she was in over her head. Lisa's comment: "I honestly never would've thought I would've been the first person to go home. This competition was everything to me. Chef Ramsay should've sent Sabrina home. There's no doubt in my mind if I ever met her in a cook-off, I'd kick her ass." Ramsay's comment: "The only thing positive I can say about Lisa's performance tonight? She didn't kill anyone."
95	2	"14 Chefs Compete"	September 22, 2010	7.16	
Before the challenge, Raj breathed heavily, catching the attention of the other chefs. Team challenge: Ramsay invited master sushi chef Masaharu Morimoto, who recently received a Michelin star, to give a demonstration of his salmon cucumber avocado rolls and tuna nigiri. The teams were split into pairs and tasked with making five pieces of salmon roll and four pieces of tuna nigiri in 10 minutes. They were provided with Miyabi Morimoto edition sushi knives by Henckels, and the winning team would get to keep their knives. Afterwards, the men chose Trev and Curtis to sit out to even the numbers. The men narrowly won, 16-15, after Boris and Vinny scored eight points and Gail and Melissa received zero. Reward/punishment: The men joined Ramsay on a trip to Cellar360 in San Francisco for a wine tasting followed by dinner at the Waterbar restaurant. The women took in a delivery of rice in order to prep sushi for service and ate various types of squid for lunch, which caused Sabrina to vomit repeatedly. During prep, the men became even more concerned about Raj after he couldn't properly prepare the supply of parsley for the night, forcing Vinny and Curtis to jump in and help him. Service: Both teams made James' first night as maitre d' hard, so Ramsay appointed Vinny and Jillian as assistant maître d’s. A salmon roll appetizer was added to the menu for service. The women completed their appetizers without issues, and while Nona performed well on fish, Emily struggled on meat, serving a raw steak. Emily then complained that she couldn't cook meat and was threatened with an automatic elimination. Melissa sent up cold mashed potatoes for the wrong ticket and was forced to switch places with Jillian. Nonetheless, the women finished service. The men, on the other hand, struggled all night. Vinny was slow taking orders and got caught by James highly recommending a table not to order sides with their entrees, as he had no faith that Raj was going to get the sides ready in time. When confronted, Vinny explained he told the table that while the sides were delicious, it would take a long time for them to be prepared. Raj was then asked if he told Vinny not to take side orders, which he denied. The latter then admitted his doubts for the former's performance, and a furious Ramsay kicked him out of the kitchen as a result. Things only got worse, as Boris took over the scallops from Trev and served them raw. Curtis sent up poorly sliced sushi rolls with no wasabi and Raj stacked the garnish station, which resulted in the latter two being thrown out. After Louis served two Caesar salads with unequal amounts of walnuts, a fed up Ramsay led the rest of the men to the back hallway and ejected them. In the dorms, Louis tried to hold a team meeting over the men's poor performances, but Raj over-talked him and called the other men "kids", causing the entire team (especially Louis, Boris, and Vinny) to turn furiously on Raj. Elimination: For the first time, during an elimination, the winning team sat down on two rows of chairs, instead of around a table, which would become a Hell's Kitchen tradition. The men initially decided to nominate Raj and Curtis, but Curtis managed to convince the rest of the team (and without Boris' knowledge) to nominate Boris instead of himself. Ramsay also called up Vinny. Fortunately for the trio, Ramsay spared them and Curtis' plan backfired when he was eliminated for his poor performance on sushi, which was the main reason for the men's collapse. Curtis's comment: "Words can't even describe how I feel right now. I mean, this experience meant so much to me, so much to my family. I'm sorry, Daddy gave it his best, but I swear to God, I'll make it up to you." Ramsay's comment: "Curtis might have been a good ol' boy, but unfortunately, he wasn't good at cooking."
96	3	"13 Chefs Compete"	September 29, 2010	6.08	
The chefs were woken up by paramedics, who gave them health exams. Team challenge: The teams were asked to cook breakfast for 50 paramedics, with the team finishing service first winning. The women had a flawless performance, save for Emily's burnt bacon. Rob sent up a fruit salad without pineapple, and Boris burned an omelette. Raj served unseasoned scrambled eggs, then talked back to Ramsay, who berated him. He then went into the storeroom and put his head in the freezer to calm down. As a result, the men failed to serve even one table, and the women had to help them. Reward/punishment: The women traveled to Santa Monica, where they took trapeze lessons at Pacific Park and enjoyed lunch poolside at the Viceroy Hotel with Ramsay. The men had to clean the kitchens and polish stemware for service. During the punishment, Trev, who initially tried to befriend and help Raj, noticed water marks on his glasses and a loaf of bread only covered halfway in ceramic wrap. For this, he angrily called him out for his constant poor performances and his failure to contribute to helping the men. An argument ensued between the two, and Raj got in Trev's face and yelled at him to shut up after the latter began angrily calling out the former's shortcomings. Before things escalated, Boris and Russell pulled him into the back hallway and calmed him down. During prep the next day, the women were concerned about Sabrina's decision not to make a prep list. Service: Trev and Sabrina prepared special culinary cocktails in the dining room. Both teams had bad services. In the women's kitchen, Jillian managed to keep appetizers leaving at a good pace, even though Emily's scallops and spaghetti were returned for being far too salty. Nona performed well on garnish but was frustrated with Emily offering to help but not cooking the garnish she needed. Melissa served a badly overcooked Dover sole and Gail dozed off while one of her pans caught fire. Although Vinny did well on appetizers, Raj once again struggled on fish; he fired his first order of scallops too early and served one portion of salmon in a disgusting stock that wasn't needed. He then irritated Ramsay by giving inconsistent times before serving it raw, and did not understand when the latter proceeded to smash it with his bare hand Vinny was ordered to help him and the men eventually managed to serve their first table. They were forced to start the next ticket over when Boris delivered raw wellingtons, and Raj took this opportunity to eat the discarded fish, further frustrating Ramsay and his teammates. Despite serving an acceptable halibut, he also cooked three Dover sole that weren't on the ticket. To make matters worse, it was the men's remaining supply of Dover sole. Horrified, Ramsay demanded Raj go out to the dining room to apologize to the customers. He protested due to his having a dirty apron, but sous-chef Scott aggressively forced him to do so. Nonetheless, the men were declared the winners as they received a higher approval rating from the diners, 54% compared to the women's 50%. Elimination: The women nominated Emily and Sabrina, the latter based on pre-service prep work. Ramsay was confused by Sabrina's nomination, but accepted the nominees. He ultimately eliminated Raj, to the men's relief, for his third poor performance in a row, as well as his general lack of kitchen etiquette and knowledge, openly telling him that he couldn't "go an inch further" with him. Raj's comment: "I can't believe it, it's just a shock. I didn't get along with anybody, I didn't get along with chef Ramsay, I didn't get along with Scott, I didn't like the menu. But it was a great experience. I had a great time, and I'm really glad I did it." Ramsay's comment: "When the going gets tough in the kitchen, a chef puts his head down and cooks. All Raj wanted to do was put his head in the freezer, and that's why his stay in Hell's Kitchen was a short one."
97	4	"12 Chefs Compete"	September 29, 2010	6.59	
Team challenge: First, Ramsay asked the chefs to refrain from smoking for 48 hours due to its negative effects on the palate. He asked them to each create a ravioli dish with their own pasta, filling and sauce after giving a demo. They then had to present the dishes from best to worst for judging. Prior to judging, Gail decided to change her ranking from third to worst as she didn't have confidence in her dish. Trev scored the winning point for the men because Gail's ravioli was underseasoned, and the men won, four-three. Reward/punishment: The men took a helicopter trip to the Terranea Resort in Rancho Palos Verdes, where they played a game of golf, and Vinny's ravioli was placed on the menu for Italian night. The women cleaned the kitchen, made pasta from scratch, and milked cows for the milk needed to make mozzarella. During the reward, Trev expressed his frustration to his team about them deeming his ravioli the worst during the challenge, as they didn't even taste it, and vented to Gail after returning to the dorm. Prior to service, the women continue to grow frustrated with Sabrina for being stubborn and unfocused during prep. Service: Media personality Jack Osbourne (British rocker Ozzy Osbourne's son) attended Italian night. The men did well on appetizers thanks to Russell, but Louis served raw salmon and burned one portion of pork while forgetting the other one on order. To make matters worse, the order was for a guest who was planning to propose to his girlfriend that night. One of Rob's pizzas was returned from the dining room for being burned on the bottom, and he was sent to the bar to eat it. Louis later brought a raw pork to the pass, and sous-chef Scott berated him for using his hands instead of a tray and called him a slob. An angry Ramsay then chewed out the men, asking them to get a grip. Boris was sent to the back for washing dishes instead of cooking. After Louis served a raw chicken parmesan, Ramsay kicked him and Boris out and replaced him on the meat station with Vinny, who managed to serve the proposal table and get the kitchen back on track. In the women's kitchen, Melissa forgot one ravioli before serving it cold, and later received a lecture for miscalculating how many ravioli were needed for three orders. Sabrina was confused on her timing for her pork chop, requiring Melissa's help, and Gail served crunchy pasta as a result of Sabrina bringing her meat to the pass early. However, the women managed to complete service and were then ordered to help the men, but struggled to do so as a result of all the previous mistakes made. Ramsay threw out the remaining chefs because no one knew whether the garnish for an order of pork was at the pass or not. The proposal took place as planned, but both teams were named losers. Elimination: The women nominated Melissa and Sabrina, while the men nominated Louis and Boris. The women initially settled on Gail as one of their nominees, but Nona convinced her team to put up Sabrina instead of Gail, which led to a heated argument in the dorms. Ramsay sent Melissa and Boris back in line and eliminated Louis for being the worst performer of the night. Louis's comment: "It's gonna be tough going back to camp and having to face my kids. But, honestly, I can say that I represented myself well. Hell's Kitchen definitely kicked my butt, but that's good for people. And that's the only way we grow." Ramsay's comment: "Louis the camp cook dreamed of fine dining, but the only thing I would trust him with is toasting a marshmallow. Kumbaya, my friend."
98	5	"11 Chefs Compete"	October 6, 2010	6.32	
Team challenge: Ramsay announced that Hell's Kitchen would host a prom for Beverly Hills High School. The chefs prepared a tasting menu, featuring an appetizer and two entrees, for the prom committee after receiving advice via video chat. The women won automatically won the challenge after the second round, since the men burned their sesame-encrusted tuna and severely overcooked their pan-seared halibut. The women then scored a third point with their potstickers, marking the first ever shutout. Reward/punishment: The women visited Knott's Berry Farm. The men cleaned the kitchens and redecorated the dining room based on the prom committee's instructions. Angered by having to be told what to do by high school students, Russell rudely addressed the committee when one of them casually talked about the men's teamwork and had to be reprimanded by James. Service: The women's challenge winning dishes, as well as the men's fish entree, were added to the menu. Vinny and Nona assisted Ramsay in plating the food. Sabrina put in a very good performance on appetizers, but she was hampered by Emily's soggy crab cakes. The problems continued as Melissa managed to overcook all 23 filets on order before the women had even finished serving appetizers. Emily and Gail then held up the kitchen by serving raw halibut and garnish, respectively. Ramsay also scolded Melissa for slicing an undercooked steak. However, Nona interrupted him, causing him to scold her instead. The men had a rocky start as Boris cooked crab cakes ahead of time and then served some of them raw. However, the team rallied behind him to send out appetizers. Thanks to Russell's leadership on meat, they completed the entrees flawlessly, save for Boris holding up a ticket due to his not having the halibut quite ready in time. Both teams finished service; Ramsay named the men winners for their strong finish and praised Russell for having "the best service in the Blue Team yet". He also named Sabrina Best of the Worst for her performance on appetizers. Nona openly disagreed, and Ramsay reminded her that none of her food was sent back to the kitchen. Elimination: Sabrina nominated Melissa and Emily. After asking Nona for her opinion, Ramsay eliminated Emily for being consistently the weakest performer on the women's team. Emily's comment: "I'm not ready to go home, but if Chef Ramsay can't see my skill, it's his loss. He can go yell at somebody else tomorrow." Ramsay's comment: "Like everyone in Hell's Kitchen, Emily started at the bottom. Unfortunately, she stayed there."
99	6	"10 Chefs Compete"	October 6, 2010	7.00	
Team change: Prior to the challenge, Ramsay moved Melissa to the Blue Team, giving her one more chance to improve, and moved Trev to the Red Team as a way for him to step up as a leader. Team challenge: The chefs were shown three of the most famous salads: the niçoise, Cobb, and Waldorf. They then prepared entree salads, to be judged by Ramsay and Bon Appétit magazine senior food editor Sarah Tenaglia. Rob's diver scallop salad was deemed better than Gail's and the Blue Team won, three-two. Reward/punishment: The Blue Team traveled to the Getty Villa in Malibu, where they were given a special tour from curator Karol Wight and enjoyed lunch. In addition, Rob received a photo shoot and his salad was added to the menu for service and featured in Bon Appétit. The Red Team had to clean and prep both kitchens and eat a raw flower salad with bugs for lunch. Service: The chef's tables featured VIP guests: Actor Kelli Williams dined in the blue kitchen, and fellow actors Mo Gaffney and Nancy Grahn dined in the red, as well as comedian Matt Walsh and his mom Audrey, who were both uncredited. American Idol contestant Carly Smithson also attended service. In the red kitchen, Gail and Trev put in strong performances on appetizers and meat, respectively, but Nona twice served raw scallops for Audrey Walsh's salad, and Trev was asked to cook them for her. Sabrina struggled throughout the night, at one point thinking that the meat station was also responsible for the garnish, and argued with Trev. In the blue kitchen, Russell had a strong performance on appetizers but was unable to serve a risotto because Boris overcooked the shrimp, while Melissa continuously sent up raw and overcooked scallops and eventually ran out, forcing Ramsay to replace Rob's scallop salad with a rock shrimp salad. Boris served chalky mashed potatoes and got distracted, resulting in a piece of paper on his station catching fire. On the last ticket, he delivered soggy garnish and got kicked out. Both teams finished service, but Ramsay refused to name a winner and asked for one nominee from each team. Elimination: The Red Team nominated Sabrina and the Blue Team nominated Boris; Ramsay also called up Nona and Melissa. Ramsay eliminated Melissa for consistently performing poorly, making too many simple mistakes, and failing to bounce back after her move to the blue team. Melissa's comment: "It pisses me off that Sabrina is still in there. I don't feel that I had the chance to really show them what I can do. And I gave it a try. It's all I can say." Ramsay's comment: "Melissa had a red jacket, she had a blue jacket, and now she has no jacket at all."
100	7	"9 Chefs Compete Part 1"	October 13, 2010	6.30	
Team challenge: The chefs spun a modified roulette wheel, featuring 18 letters of the alphabet. (Note: In the challenge, 36 spots were allocated to 18 letters of the alphabet. There were also two green spots represented with Hell's Kitchen logos, although in this season, none of the balls landed in the green spots.) Each chef had to name an ingredient starting with the letter that the ball landed on. The team then had 30 minutes to cook one dish using those ingredients. (Note: Vinny spun twice, choosing kale and yam. Boris picked miso, Rob selected striped sea bass and Russell opted for asparagus. For the Red Team, Trev opted for rutabaga, Jillian selected cauliflower, Sabrina picked bok choy, Gail chose fennel and Nona selected salmon.) The Red Team split the cauliflower puree for their grilled salmon, but Rob failed to season the Blue Team's asparagus and yams, and the men lost. Reward/punishment: The Red Team flew to Las Vegas, enjoyed a stay at the Rio All Suites Hotel and met magicians Penn and Teller. The Blue Team prepped over 1,000 pounds of potatoes for assortments of French fries for Family Night. Service: Ramsay's family including Tana, Megan, Matilda, Holly and Jack in addition to TV host Jerry Springer and his family were in attendance for service. Both teams managed to serve the fries on time and had relatively few problems. In the blue kitchen, Vinny served too many portions of risotto and then tried to serve an old risotto to Tana after falling behind. Boris sweated profusely and nearly sliced a perfectly cooked steak on a dirty board and Rob struggled to keep up on garnish. In the red kitchen, Jillian served a risotto with too little puree but quickly recovered, and Nona fell behind on garnish, requiring her team's assistance. In addition, Sabrina annoyed Trev due to asking him to continuously double check her meat, served raw chicken that the latter thought was cooked, cooked a grilled cheese too early and then argued with Trev about it. Nonetheless, both teams won with a 90% satisfaction rating from the diners, but Ramsay had them each nominate two chefs for elimination. Elimination: The Red Team nominated Sabrina and Nona and the Blue Team nominated Boris and Rob. Ramsay called down Nona and Rob, asked the latter to remove his jacket, and surprised him with a clean one before sending Nona back in line, choosing not to eliminate anyone. Ramsay's comment: "Tonight, I finally got a respectable service, so I gave them a little respect and didn't send anyone home. But tomorrow, they're in for the most intense dinner service in the history of Hell's Kitchen."
101	8	"9 Chefs Compete Part 2"	October 13, 2010	7.36	
Team challenge: The chefs visited Bristol Farms, where each team was given 20 minutes and $60 to buy ingredients for four dishes: beef, pork, lamb and chicken. Since the Red Team had one extra member, Jillian and Gail collaborated on the pork dish. Ramsay brought in four guest judges: Gayot Guidebooks owner Sophie Gayot, Campanile chef/owner Mark Peel, Yelp blogger Libby Rego, and Nobu West Hollywood general manager Justin Wyborn. One judge in each round gave a score based on how much they would pay for the dish. The red team won $110-101, with Nona's pan-seared ribeye being valued the highest at $32. Reward/punishment: The Red Team went sailing, had a seaside dinner and went mambo dancing at the Maya Hotel in Long Beach. The Blue Team was forced to fumigate the kitchens and prep them for the black tie dinner service. Service: Hell's Kitchen's 100th service was an invitation-only, black tie event. Previous winners Rock Harper and Christina Machamer (seasons three and four) dined in the blue kitchen, and Danny Veltri and Holli Ugalde (seasons five and seven) in the red. Various dignitaries and celebrities were also in attendance: L.A. magazine dine editor Lesley Bargar Suter, Glee actors Iqbal Theba and Patrick Gallagher, and Hugh Garvey and Sarah Tenaglia from Bon Appétit. Each table received a plate of welcoming caviar. The Red Team near-flawlessly completed service, their only problems being Nona serving an old risotto and Trev falling behind on garnish due to his not knowing which garnishes went with which protein. Eventually, the entire kitchen was called over to help him, and he was sent out to get some fresh air after he served burnt carrots and squash and raw gnocchi. Nona took control of the station, ensuring a smooth service, in particular thanks to Gail's leadership. In the blue kitchen, despite Boris' first appetizer cappelini being "quite nice" according to Chef Scott, Boris struggled to keep up on all other appetizers and give accurate times, eventually requiring Rob's help which Ramsay threatened to go "fucking ballistic" over. Russell on garnish refused to communicate properly with Rob, which led to the latter forgetting one portion of chicken on order. This in turn backed up the kitchen, putting them eight tables behind the Red Team. Vinny had three overcooked lobsters returned from the dining room. He and Rob then served raw lobster and chicken, respectively, and Ramsay angrily kicked out the Blue Team. The Red Team completed their service, being deemed clear winners. Elimination: The Blue Team nominated Boris but could not decide between Rob and Vinny, so Ramsay nominated both of them. Ramsay eliminated Boris for his inconsistent performances, but praised him for his big heart. He did not comment on Boris' elimination. He then had Trev step forward as the episode ended in a cliffhanger. Boris's comment: "My dream was to win Hell's Kitchen and prove to Gordon Ramsay that I can do it. But it was actually a lot more difficult than I thought it would be. He's a tough son of a bitch, I'll tell you that. But I go home with no regrets and I leave here inspired."
102	9	"8 Chefs Compete"	November 10, 2010	5.47	
Team change: After warning Trev about his horrendous performance, Ramsay reassigned him to the Blue Team and warned him he was on his last chance, re-igniting the battle of the sexes. No elimination sequence was given for Boris, but his jacket and burnt photo could be seen when Ramsay hung up Gail's jacket. Sous-chef Scott brought a room service cart and the chefs enjoyed its various offerings, but Ramsay noticed they could not tell a five-star appetizer from a fast-food one, leading to the next challenge. Team challenge: The teams participated in the blind taste test. Russell identified two ingredients compared to Gail's one. Neither Sabrina nor Rob could identify any. Jillian and Vinny both scored two points. The women won, six-five, and Nona impressed Ramsay on her palate after scoring three points in the final round. Reward/punishment: The women were rewarded with a $2,000 shopping spree at a local boutique, followed by lunch with Ramsay at Michael Mina's restaurant XIV. The men removed recyclables from a garbage truck filled, ate American cheese sandwiches for lunch, and prepped the kitchens for service. Prior to service, Trev noticed the animosity present in the kitchen, particularly from Russell, acknowledging that things had changed since he had been on the men's team and knew he would have to perform perfectly that night in order to stay. Service: In the women's kitchen, Jillian and Sabrina produced perfect risottos and scallops, respectively, but Nona forgot to cook one portion of chicken and then struggled to slice it. Sabrina had a strong performance on fish and, thanks to her leadership, the women managed to keep sending out entrees. However, Nona forgot one beef, followed by three more, and argued with Ramsay after he caught her trying to sear the beef in a cold pan. He then threw her out of the kitchen and had Jillian take over. In the men's kitchen, Rob served improperly seared scallops, followed by raw ones, forcing Ramsay to show him how to cook them. Rob, under pressure from Russell, sent up a raw halibut but shaped up after receiving a warning. Ramsay kicked out Vinny for serving an overcooked egg and raw gnocchi, followed by Russell for serving raw chicken and Rob for more raw fish. Trev managed to complete his team's service with help from sous-chef Andi. Ramsay was dissatisfied but named the women winners, in particular praising Jillian and Sabrina. He also named Trev Best of the Worst. After the post-mortem, Ramsay gave Nona encouragement but warned her not to argue with him again during service. Elimination: Trev nominated Rob and Russell. Ramsay sent Russell back in line and eliminated Rob for his serious downward spiral and disintegrating performances over the past four services, as well as his outstayed welcome. Rob's comment: "You know, I had a one-in-seven shot at this point to win the prize, and I'm just pissed I didn't make it further. It's unfortunate because I think the wrong guy went home tonight, but I guess everybody says that." Ramsay's comment: "If the size of one's waist corresponds to the size of one's talent, then Rob would be a fantastic chef. Instead, he just wears gigantic pants."
103	10	"7 Chefs Compete"	November 10, 2010	5.93	
Team challenge: The teams competed in a relay challenge. They were given 30 minutes to prepare three entrees from the Hell's Kitchen menu: mushroom tagliatelle, poached chicken and salmon with lobster ragout, with one chef allowed in the kitchen at a time. That chef had five minutes to cook and 15 seconds to brief the next teammate. The men won, two-one, as Jillian dropped the women's salmon while pulling it out of the oven. Reward/punishment: The men were rewarded with a shopping spree at cooking store Sur La Table, followed by lunch with Ramsay at the two-Michelin starred Mélisse and got to meet the restaurant's owner, Josiah Citrin. The women took in deliveries of food and cleaned the wine glasses. Afterwards, sous-chef Scott informed the teams that they would be creating their own menus for service. During the prior evening, Trev and Vinny gossiped about Russell while relaxing in the hot tub, angering the latter. Service: Citrin and Kansas City Chiefs quarterback Matt Cassel were guests for this service. Nona served a raw mushroom risotto and Gail sent up seven raw and overcooked lobsters for the women's lobster capellini, causing Ramsay to kick her out. In the men's kitchen, Vinny forgot the lamb for Citrin's table and then served it raw, angering Ramsay. Russell managed to serve the refire, but Citrin reacted negatively. Vinny also sent up a raw sea bass. Although both teams completed service, Ramsay refused to name a winner and asked the chefs to each select one nominee for elimination. Elimination: Russell nominated Vinny, Trev and Vinny nominated Sabrina, and all the women nominated Trev. Ramsay awarded a black jacket to Trev, followed by Jillian, Nona, Russell and Sabrina. After hearing Gail and Vinny's pleas, Ramsay gave Gail the last black jacket and eliminated Vinny for his serious downward spiral and worsening performances over the past three services. Vinny's comment: "I lost. I had my shot right in front of my face, and I blew it. I came here with the intention of winning, and I failed. This is the worst night of my life. Chef Ramsay, I really wanted that black jacket so badly, you have no idea." Ramsay's comment: "When the competition first started, I thought Vinny was the one to beat. But after tonight's dismal performance, he's now the one to go home."
104	11	"6 Chefs Compete"	November 17, 2010	5.92	
Challenge: The chefs had 30 minutes to prepare five servings of an amuse-bouche to be judged by five guest judges: LudoBites chef/owner Ludo Lefebvre, Hatfield's owners, husband and wife Quinn and Karen Hatfield, Jar owner Suzanne Tracht, and Providence chef Michael Cimarusti. The judges scored each dish on a scale of one-10 on presentation and taste, for a possible total of 100. The final scores were as follows: Russell (100), Gail (87), Sabrina (70), Nona (67), Jillian (65) and Trev (62). Reward/punishment: Russell received a guided tour of the prize restaurant from executive chef Kerry Simon, and enjoyed a special lunch. He also chose Gail, as the runner-up, to join him. The other chefs cleaned the dorms and prepped the kitchen. Service: Nona served tableside Steak Diane. MLB All-Star Nomar Garciaparra and soccer Olympian Mia Hamm were in attendance. The black jackets' first dinner service was terrible; Sabrina, Trev, and Gail backed up the kitchen repeatedly on appetizers, serving overcooked and burnt risottos, "stewed" lobster spaghetti, and colorless scallops, respectively. Gail then overcooked her scallops when she tried to re-sear them. Russell caused friction by ordering Trev around the appetizer station, while Trev and Sabrina struggled to work together. The former yelled at the latter over a miscommunication over an order of spaghetti, sous-chef Scott angrily told him to get his act together, and Ramsay berated them for not working as a team as Trev got increasingly angry over Sabrina's repeated requests for times. The entrees nearly caught up to the appetizers. However, Gail served an overcooked halibut that was stuck to the pan and poached salmon, Jillian served salty mashed potatoes and Sabrina sent up an undressed salad. After Russell delivered raw wellingtons to the pass, the chefs were warned that service would be shut down after another mistake. Some entrees were served, but Russell served a raw ribeye and Ramsay kept his promise and kicked the team out, demanding two nominees. Elimination: The black jackets nominated Trev and Sabrina. (Note: With seven, Sabrina tied Autumn Lewis from season seven for the most nominations for any contestant in Hell's Kitchen history, a record that would later be shared with Elise Wims (season nine), Clemenza Caserta (10) and season 12 winner Scott Commings.) Ramsay eliminated Sabrina for her inconsistency and lack of maturity, but praised her for her big heart. Sabrina's comment: "I came here in Hell's Kitchen not knowing anything about how a brigade works. Being 22, I am a bit immature. There's a lot I have to learn about life. But I'm leaving Hell's Kitchen as a fighter. I've fought from day one. I fought with Chef Ramsay. I fought with everybody. I gave it everything that I had. This experience has definitely changed my life forever. I'm definitely gonna continue on this path, wherever it takes me. Chef Ramsay hasn't seen the last of me." Ramsay's comment: "Sabrina was quite dramatic in her final plea, but I'm not looking for a drama queen. I'm looking for a head chef."
105	12	"5 Chefs Compete"	November 24, 2010	5.09	
Challenge: The chefs had to prepare 80 portions of their signature dishes in one hour in a food truck; the diners at LA Market ranked the dishes from best to worst. Over 40% of the diners voted for Gail's skirt steak with mangoes and pecans as the best, narrowly beating out Nona's chicken salad and bacon sandwich, while Russell's grilled octopus and aioli salad was deemed the worst. Reward/punishment: Gail received a makeover at José Eber's studio in Beverly Hills followed by a trip back to Hollywood for a new style look by Steve "Cojo" Cojocaru. The others had to clean the exterior of Hell's Kitchen, followed by the food trucks. Service: Ramsay assigned stations to the chefs. In addition to Cojo, Paris Hilton and twelve Marines were also in attendance. The kitchen immediately got off to a terrible start, with Jillian repeatedly overcooking scallops due to her inexperience working the fish station, and Nona undercooking spaghetti. Both managed to recover after Russell showed Jillian how to cook the scallops. However, the kitchen continued to have trouble on entrées, with Jillian continuing to struggle on fish until Russell helped her, and Gail failing to communicate with the rest of the kitchen. After Gail and Trev served under cooked fries and ribeye respectively Ramsay and Scott stormed out of the kitchen, making this the second time he did so. The final five sent out appetizers under Russell and Nona's leadership, but stalled on entrées when Trev overcooked ribeye and then tried to quickly flash grill the undercooked ribeye from before (which had sat on the pass for fifteen minutes) for the re-fire. Ramsay returned with Scott and shuffled the chefs' stations, issuing an ultimatum to kick out anyone who made a mistake. He kicked out Gail for undercooking salmon and Jillian for serving a raw egg dish, while the remaining three completed service. Elimination: After dinner service, Ramsay berated the chefs, particularly Gail, Jillian, and Trev. Ramsay noted that Jillian had better services weeks ago, while Gail couldn't seem to cook for more than one table at a time, and that it was Trev's undercooked meat that drove him to exit the kitchen. He then instructed the team to come up with two nominations for elimination, and the team ultimately decided on Gail and Trev. Ramsay accepted the nominations but also demanded an explanation from Jillian for her performance. Ramsay eliminated Gail for her serious downward spiral and worsening performances over the past three services, remarking that he expected her to go further based on her strong start and was disappointed. Gail's comment: "I wish I could've stayed longer, but my time was up. I thought I was a strong cook before I came to Hell's Kitchen. But now, after leaving Hell's Kitchen, I think I realized that I have a few things to work on. I did disappoint myself. But there are so many highlights. Winning the challenges and getting to go on the rewards, they totally outweigh all the lowlights. I leave here with great memories, new friends, fantastic clothes, and a great haircut." Ramsay's comment: "Gail's performance in Hell's Kitchen was up and down, up and down, and up and down. Roller coasters are great for amusement parks, not kitchens."
106	13	"4 Chefs Compete"	December 1, 2010	5.83	
Challenge: Each chef had 30 minutes to cook an entrée using the ingredients provided; Ramsay tasted each dish and identified its ingredients by taste alone. This led to the actual "taste it, make it" challenge, where the chefs had 45 minutes to recreate a dish that Ramsay made without knowing the ingredients. Jillian made a good-tasting dish, but missed every ingredient except for the chicken stock. Trev correctly identified port wine in the sauce and carrot purée (everyone else used yam purée), but forgot to plate the puree, and used pork instead of veal. Nona and Russell were declared the top two for correctly identifying veal, but Russell seasoned his cabbage with bacon instead of pancetta as required, thus giving Nona the win. Reward/punishment: Nona was rewarded with a spa day at Hands On Boutique in Beverly Hills, a copy of Ramsay's cookbook, Recipes From a 3 Star Chef, and a set of Demeyere Cookware. She chose Russell, as the runner-up, to accompany her for her spa day. Trev and Jillian prepped the kitchen and did laundry, including Ramsay's chef's whites. Prior to service, Ramsay gave Jillian a pep talk after her recent poor performances. Service: Trev spent a long time slicing beef Wellingtons despite cooking them perfectly. When he tripped and forgot two wellingtons, Ramsay put him in "time out" twice. Russell had some mishaps on scallops and halibut and Nona miscooked risotto twice, but Jillian cooked garnishes perfectly. Eventually, they completed service, which Ramsay called "not perfect, but bloody good". Elimination: Ramsay asked for two nominations, and the vote initially ended up deadlocked, with the two men voting for the two women, and vice-versa. Trev eventually broke the deadlock by switching one of his votes from Jillian to Russell, resulting in Trev and Russell being nominated. However, Ramsay spared them and surprised the chefs with visits from their families (Nona's husband and son, Jillian's boyfriend and sons, Russell's parents and girlfriend, and Trev's best friend and sister), announcing no elimination until next time.
107	14	"4 Chefs Compete Again"	December 8, 2010	5.33	
Ramsay announced that since no chef was eliminated last time, he would eliminate two chefs in this round. Challenge: The chefs had 45 minutes to cook a fusion cuisine dish, using a combination of ingredients from two countries, selected by drawing flags at random. (Note: Trev drew Mexico and China, Russell drew France and India, Nona drew Greece and Italy and Jillian drew Spain and Thailand.) Each dish was then judged by three chefs who were experts in fusion cuisine. While Trev and Russell received negative reviews, and Nona's was judged to be decent but not to work as a fusion dish, Jillian impressed with her Spanish/Thai paella dish. Reward/punishment: Jillian joined her family and Ramsay for lunch at Spago in Beverly Hills, while the others cleared out the dorm furnishings of their past opponents. Prior to the service, Ramsay told the chefs they would each have a turn handling the pass. Service: Los Angeles Lakers basketball player Sasha Vujačić was a guest at the chef's table while Sanjaya Malakar attended as a guest. As each chef took a turn on the pass, Scott introduced some deliberate errors. Russell rejected Trev's scallops and spotted pecans in a salad instead of walnuts. Nona was strong in leadership, rejecting Russell's chowder, but was not able to spot mashed celery root being served instead of mashed potatoes. Trev tried to send out entrees before appetizers on a table and had trouble getting the attention of his teammates, but spotted sea bass being served instead of halibut and kept entrées leaving the kitchen at a steady rate. Jillian initially struggled in leadership, but recovered after prompting by Ramsay, rejecting Trev's undercooked fish, though she failed to spot New York strip being served instead of ribeye. Elimination: As soon as the elimination ceremony began, Ramsay eliminated Trev without asking him to justify why he should continue to the final, judging him to have been clearly the weakest of the final four both in terms of his overall track record and running the pass, but praising him for never giving up. After hearing from the remaining three, Ramsay then selected Russell and Nona to advance to the final, eliminating a teary-eyed Jillian. Ramsay allowed Jillian to keep her jacket, though her photo was burned. Trev's comment: "I'm feeling, you know, disappointed. I really overcame a lot at Hell's Kitchen. I took more shit from the other contestants than I did from Chef Ramsay. I was struggling with egos, with attitude, up against executive chefs. I stood on my own two feet in this kitchen. I really, really tried to win this thing. But ultimately, heart and determination did not win out over experience. So fuck 'em." Jillian's comment: "I never thought I would make it this far. This experience proved to me that I have what it takes to be a chef. I got great comments from some world-class chefs. I'm the only person that never got put up for elimination in Hell's Kitchen, and that says a lot. It's hard, but I did the best I could. I'm not gonna give up. I know I made my kids proud, and I know this isn't the end for me. Like, honestly, I don't feel like I deserve to be standing here. I feel like I should be in the final, too, but..." Ramsay's comment: "Jillian didn't let her lack of fine dining experience get in the way. She made it this far because of her passion and determination. Unfortunately, it just wasn't enough to get her into the final."
108	15	"2 Chefs Compete"	December 15, 2010	5.85	
Nona and Russell talked with the sous chefs on preparing a full dinner service where they would run their own kitchens. They were taken by helicopter to the top of the JW Marriott for their final individual challenge. Challenge: Nona and Russell prepared five dishes for a taste challenge; each dish was judged by an executive or executive chef, including Kerry Simon. Russell won 3–2. Reward: Russell was granted first pick in drafting a team using the eight chefs eliminated from the competition prior to the final. Russell picked Jillian, Vinny, Sabrina and Rob, while Nona picked Gail, Melissa and Trev, and was left with Boris. In particular, Vinny felt Russell cost him a black jacket by nominating him, and did not want to be on his team, displaying poor attitude throughout prep until Russell threatened to kick him out. Service: Both teams got through appetizers fine, save for Vinny undercooking scallops and Trev overdressing a beet salad. On entrees, Sabrina cooked a filet in stock before she served it raw, so Russell switched her with Vinny on fish. Rob ran out of tomato water for ravioli and Russell sent Jillian to help him, irritating Rob and nearly leading to a physical confrontation. Russell tried to serve two tables at once, but this backfired when one dish was returned for being undercooked, earning him a warning from Ramsay. In the red kitchen, Boris served raw halibut three times, forcing Trev to jump in, causing an argument to erupt between the two that Nona had to defuse. Melissa served raw steak to Nona's husband, but recovered. Both teams finished service. Winner: Ramsay determined the winner based on the diners' comments and his own observations. Each finalist stood in front of a door; Nona's door opened, making her the eighth winner of Hell's Kitchen. Unlike all the runners-up of Hell's Kitchen before and after him, Russell took his defeat ungraciously, blaming his teammates for his loss. Russell's comment: "I'm pissed. I'm not happy at all. I chose the team that I wanted, and I thought they would help me win, and in fact, they helped me lose, so, you know, thanks a lot, guys. You will never get a job in any city I work. I'm gonna definitely blackball you guys, because you guys fucked me so royally tonight." Nona's comment: "My door opened! It opened! This is nuts! I fought, I fought, and I fought, and this is just amazing. I'm so thankful. This was a huge sacrifice. Missing my son's first birthday, missing his first steps, it's absolutely worth it to make his life better." Ramsay's comment: "When Hell's Kitchen first started, I used to say, 'No, no, no' to Nona. After every service, she improved dramatically, and I was soon saying, 'Yes, yes, yes'. She has a phenomenal palate and a real passion for cooking. Soon, all of America will be saying 'yes' with me when they see her excel as the head chef of LA Market."
