= Hell's Kitchen (American TV series) season 9 =

Hell's Kitchen
- Season 9
- Region 1 DVD cover
- Hosted by: Gordon Ramsay
- No. of contestants: 18
- Winner: Paul Niedermann
- Runner-up: William "Will" Lustberg
- No. of episodes: 16

Release
- Original network: Fox
- Original release: July 18 – September 19, 2011

Season chronology
- ← Previous; Season 8 Next → Season 10

Season 9 of the American competitive reality television series Hell's Kitchen premiered on July 18, 2011, on Fox and concluded on September 19, 2011, with a two-hour season finale. Gordon Ramsay returned as host and head chef, while Scott Leibfried and Andi Van Willigan returned as the Blue Team and Red Team's sous-chefs respectively. James Lukanik returned as maître d'.

The season was won by junior sous-chef Paul Niedermann, with fellow sous-chef William "Will" Lustberg finishing second.

The entire season took about six weeks to film, and was filmed between April and May 2011. It also saw the show return to its original one season per year schedule, having run two seasons each in 2009 and 2010 due to the after-effects of the 2007–2008 Writers Guild of America strike.

== Contestants ==
18 chefs competed in season 9.

| Contestant | Age^{1} | Occupation | Hometown | Result |
|---|---|---|---|---|
| Paul Niedermann | 27 | Jr. Sous Chef | Davie, Florida | Winner |
| Will Lustberg | 31 | Sous chef | Jersey City, New Jersey | Runner-Up |
| Elise Wims (Note: Chef returned to Hells Kitchen again on Season 17, finished at 7th place.) | 26 | Line Cook | Pittsburgh, Pennsylvania | Eliminated before Finals |
| Tommy Stevens | 31 | Line Cook | Brewster, New York | Eliminated before Finals |
| Jennifer Normant (Note: Chef returned to Hells Kitchen again on Season 17, finished at 6th place.) | 34 | Chef de Cuisine | Boston, Massachusetts | Eliminated after Fourteenth Service |
| Elizabeth Bianchi | 27 | Line Cook | New York, New York | Eliminated after Twelfth Service |
| Natalie Blake | 23 | Sous chef | Harrodsburg, Kentucky | Eliminated after Eleventh Service |
| Carolina "Carrie" Keep | 31 | Pantry chef | Dallas, Texas | Eliminated after Tenth Service |
| Jamie Gregorich | 24 | Sous chef | Bradenton, Florida | Eliminated after Ninth Service |
| Jonathon Plumley | 34 | Head cook | Memphis, Tennessee | Eliminated after Eighth Service |
| Krupa Patel | 30 | Private chef | Queens, New York | Eliminated after Seventh Service |
| Monterray Keys | 34 | Line cook | Darby, Pennsylvania | Eliminated after Sixth Service |
| Gina Melcher | 34 | Restaurant consultant | Cape May, New Jersey | Eliminated after Fifth Service |
| Hee Jun "Chino" Chang | 39 | Executive Chef | Hatboro, Pennsylvania | Eliminated after Fourth Service |
| Amanda Colello | 26 | Personal chef | Sun City, California | Eliminated after Third Service |
| Brendan Heavey | 31 | Head chef | Hoboken, New Jersey | Eliminated after Second Service |
| Steven Paluba | 44 | Sauté chef | Ridge, New York | Eliminated after First Service |
| Jason Zepaltas (Note: Chef returned to Hells Kitchen again on Season 12, where he finished runner-up.) | 29 | Line cook | Chicago, Illinois | Hospitalized before First Service |

Notes

^{1} At time of filming.

== Contestant progress ==
| No. | Chef | Original teams | | Switched teams | | | | | | | | | | Individuals | | | Finals |
| No. | Chef | 901 | 902 | 903 | 904 | 905 | 906 | 907 | 908 | 909 | 910 | 911 | 912 | 913 | 914 | 915 | 916 |
|---|---|---|---|---|---|---|---|---|---|---|---|---|---|---|---|---|---|
| 1 | Paul | LOSE | LOSE | WIN | LOSE | LOSE | NOM | LOSE | LOSE | WIN | LOSE | LOSE | WIN | IN | IN | IN | WINNER |
| 2 | Will | LOSE | LOSE | WIN | LOSE | LOSE | LOSE | LOSE | LOSE | WIN | LOSE | LOSE | WIN | IN | IN | IN | RUNNER-UP |
| 3 | Elise | WIN | WIN | LOSE | NOM | NOM | WIN | LOSE | WIN | NOM | LOSE | NOM | NOM | NOM | NOM | OUT | Paul's team |
| 4 | Tommy | LOSE | LOSE | WIN | LOSE | NOM | LOSE | LOSE | LOSE | WIN | NOM | LOSE | WIN | IN | IN | OUT | Will's team |
| 5 | Jennifer | WIN | WIN | NOM (Note: Jennifer & Carrie were nominated as well as Amanda for elimination by Chef Ramsay) | LOSE | LOSE | WIN | LOSE | WIN | LOSE | LOSE | LOSE | NOM | NOM | OUT | | Will's team |
| 6 | Elizabeth | WIN | WIN | LOSE | LOSE | LOSE | WIN | LOSE | WIN | LOSE | LOSE | LOSE | OUT | | | | Paul's team |
| 7 | Natalie | WIN | WIN | WIN | LOSE | LOSE | LOSE | NOM | NOM | WIN | LOSE | OUT | | | | | Will's team |
| 8 | Carrie | WIN | WIN | NOM (Note: Carrie & Jennifer were nominated as well as Amanda for elimination by Chef Ramsay) | NOM | LOSE | WIN | LOSE | WIN | NOM | OUT | | | | | | Paul's team |
| 9 | Jamie | WIN | WIN | LOSE | LOSE | LOSE | WIN | NOM | WIN | OUT | | | | | | | |
| 10 | Jonathon | LOSE | LOSE | WIN | LOSE | LOSE | NOM | NOM | OUT | | | | | | | | Paul's team |
| 11 | Krupa | WIN | WIN | LOSE | LOSE | NOM | WIN | OUT | | | | | | | | | Will's team |
| 12 | Monterray | NOM | LOSE | WIN | NOM | NOM | OUT | | | | | | | | | | |
| 13 | Gina | WIN | WIN | LOSE | LOSE | OUT | | | | | | | | | | | |
| 14 | Chino | NOM | NOM | WIN | OUT | | | | | | | | | | | | |
| 15 | Amanda | WIN | WIN | OUT (Note: Amanda was eliminated after being nominated as well as Jennifer & Carrie by Chef Ramsay) | | | | | | | | | | | | | |
| 16 | Brendan | LOSE | OUT | | | | | | | | | | | | | | |
| 17 | Steven | OUT | | | | | | | | | | | | | | | |
| 18 | Jason | HOSP | | | | | | | | | | | | | | | |

Keywords

- WIN = Won the dinner service
- LOSE = Lost the dinner service
- BoB = Best of the Best, usually exempt from nomination
- BoW = Best of the Worst, sometimes exempt from nomination
- IN = not nominated for elimination
- NOM = nominated for elimination
- OUT = eliminated normally
- LEFT = withdrew from competition
- HOSP = eliminated due to hospitalization
- EJEC = eliminated during service

Color key
Chef was eliminated after regular nomination
Chef was eliminated after Ramsay's nomination
Chef was eliminated without nomination
Chef was eliminated from winning team
Chef was eliminated in the Cook For Your Life challenge
Chef was nominated to participate in the Cook For Your Life challenge
Chef was eliminated during service
Chef withdrew from the competition
Chef was the Best of the Best/Worst
Chef was retained after regular nomination
Chef was retained after Ramsay's nomination
Chef's nomination was voided
The winner of Hell's Kitchen
The runner-up of Hell's Kitchen

== Episodes ==
| No. overall | No. in season | Title | Original release date | U.S. viewers (millions) |
|---|---|---|---|---|
| 109 | 1 | "18 Chefs Compete" | July 18, 2011 | 5.84 |
Eighteen new chefs were brought to the Orpheum Theatre, where they walked onto a stage behind a curtain with their covered platters bearing their names and the sounds of an audience cheering and chanting could be heard. But after an announcer introduced the chefs, the curtain opened to reveal an empty theatre. Chef Ramsay appeared and reminded them they were not stars yet and announced the winner would become the head chef at BLT Steak in New York City. He then told the chefs to return to Hell's Kitchen and cook their signature dishes. Team challenge/signature dish: The women (red team) competed against the men (blue team), and had 45 minutes to prepare their signature dish, judged by Ramsay. Will's sheep's milk gnudi scored over Carrie's chicken fried ribeye (as she put sugar in her mashed potato), Amanda's eggplant rollatini and Brendan's salmon both scored a point, Jennifer's pork scored over Jonathon's "punch-drunk chicken" (he was even threatened with elimination on the spot after he revealed that he used canned pineapple slices and claimed he had "limited time"), Paul's eggplant involtini scored over Krupa's stuffed naan, which Ramsay called "Crapa", neither Jamie's lamb lollipops nor Steven's seared diver scallops and mushroom risotto earned a point, Elise's scallops scored over Chino's dish as he used too much miso, Monterray's sea bass and Natalie's lamb both scored a point, as well as Elizabeth and Tommy's dishes, and finally Gina's pan-roasted pistachio scallops lost to Jason's pork tacos as the scallops were burnt on the top. The men won 6-5. Reward/punishment: The men were treated to lunch at the L.A. Market restaurant with season eight winner Nona Sivley, while the women had to prep the kitchens for service. Jason's exit: Shortly before dinner service, Jason became short of breath and was rushed to the hospital; he would not return to Hell's Kitchen. (Note: Jason returned in season 12 and finished as the runner-up.) Jason is responsible for the fastest exit in Hell's Kitchen history for any reason. No elimination sequence was given for Jason, but his jacket and burned photo was seen next to Gina's and Krupa's. Neither he nor Ramsay commented on his departure. Service: Baseball legend Fred Lynn attended opening night. In the men's kitchen, Chino was scolded for asking Ramsay to repeat an order, Steven served appetizers for the wrong table, and Monterray brought garnish for the entrées before a single appetizer was served. However, thanks to Will taking control, the team managed to send out appetizers. On entrées, Chino was sent to the chef's table for the rest of the night for burning cod. Steven then took over the fish station, but overcooked scallops and Ramsay also sent him to the chef's table for arguing that he thought they were cooked properly. Tommy took over, but was sent to the chef's table as well after he boiled scallops. Additionally, despite Jonathon and Paul cooking meat perfectly, they couldn't serve it because Monterray was late on garnish, then Brendan burned potatoes (the latter was also seen sitting at the chef's table later that night despite not been shown being kicked off the station). In the women's kitchen, Elise shouted over Ramsay while he was calling out an order and then served soupy risotto, prompting Krupa to take over, resulting in the women successfully serving appetizers. After Carrie overcooked scallops, Elise attempted to take over but neglected her responsibilities at the appetizer station; Ramsay sent Elise to the chef's table for the rest of the night. Thanks to Krupa's strong performance on meat, the women were able to serve some entrées. After customers began leaving, Ramsay shut the kitchens down. Ramsay declared the women winners for at least serving entrees, and the men were ordered to nominate two chefs for elimination. (Note: This was the first season where the Best of the Worst did not get to choose the nominees for elimination, though they were still guaranteed to be safe from elimination.) Elimination: Steven and Monterray were nominated, while Ramsay called up Chino. He sent both Chino and Monterray back in line and eliminated Steven for being the worst performer of the night. Steven's comment: "It's embarrassing, being the first one kicked off. I think that Chef Ramsay made a mistake, but it is what it is. It's done. You know, nice guys always finish last. That's probably me." Ramsay's comment: "I realized early on that Steven has much chance of being the head chef of BLT Steak as I do of winning a gold medal in figure skating."
| 110 | 2 | "16 Chefs Compete" | July 19, 2011 | 5.77 |
The chefs were awakened to the sound of a boy playing an electric guitar, and were brought outside. Team challenge: The chefs worked in pairs to grill four pieces of meat to Ramsay's standards in 20 minutes: a medium rare New York strip, a medium ribeye, a medium well filet mignon, and a well-done burger. Jennifer, Gina and Elizabeth formed a trio, while Will worked alone. Each team would earn one point per piece of acceptable meat. For the women, Amanda and Krupa scored 4, Elise and Carrie scored 1 due to their friction, Jamie and Natalie scored 3, and the trio scored 2. For the men, Jonathon and Brendan scored 2, Tommy and Chino scored 3, while Paul and Monterray scored 2. However, Will achieved a perfect score of 4, giving the men an 11-10 win. Reward/punishment: The men were rewarded with a trip to Palm Springs, California via private jet, where they had lunch with Ramsay in the mountains. The women cleaned the grills, had blended meat for lunch, and prepped a side of beef. Service: Carrie and Will served table-side Caesar salads while Krupa and Monterray served table-side prime ribs. In the women's kitchen, Jennifer served squab in a brisket but recovered and Carrie was slow serving table side caesar salads, requiring Krupa's help. Krupa also dropped the prime rib on the floor when serving it, but Ramsay was able to use some from the men's team. In the men's kitchen, Chino twice overcooked risotto while at the same time burning it on the bottom but managed to recover and get appetizers out. Brendan fired a sea bass early and then tried to serve the bass whilst lying to Ramsay that it was a new one. Tommy overcooked duck, and the men were kicked out after Brendan served raw sea bass. The women completed service and were deemed clear winners. Elimination: Brendan and Chino were nominated. Ramsay eliminated Brendan for his arrogance, being responsible for the men's defeat in two consecutive services and lying to Ramsay during service. Ramsay then announced that one woman would be moved to the men's team the next morning as the men were now three members down, much to the men's chagrin. Brendan's comment: "I'm out. Don't hate the player, hate the game. I'm sad to leave Hell's Kitchen, but I'm gonna go back to New York and lead another kitchen to greatness. I just want to give a shoutout to Carrie. Good luck. I am your biggest fan, and call me, all right?" Ramsay's comment: "The only thing bigger than Brendan's ego are the lies that he tells, and I can't have that in Hell's Kitchen."
| 111 | 3 | "15 Chefs Compete" | July 25, 2011 | 5.95 |
Team change: The women agreed to send Carrie to the men, but Ramsay chose Natalie. Team challenge: The chefs were woken up by a troupe of clowns and sent to take in a delivery of naan bread. Ramsay welcomed 50 children and their mothers for a special "Mommy and Me" service. Each team served quesadilla and macaroni for the children and panini (made from the naan bread) for the mothers. In the blue kitchen, Natalie led her new teammates strongly, with the only issue being Jonathon sending up a panini with too little chicken. Jamie burnt quesadilla and was berated for sulking, while Elise and Carrie argued throughout the challenge. Both teams got to the last ticket, but the blue team narrowly won their third straight challenge. Reward/punishment: The blue team was rewarded with dinner and a medieval jousting tournament at Medieval Times in Buena Park, California. The red team cleaned the dining room, built a playground, and prepped the kitchen for family night. Service: Ramsay assigned Chino and Gina to be assistant maitre d's. Each table served Margherita pizzas, assigned to Elise and Jonathon. The red team did well on appetizers thanks to Krupa, but struggled on entrees, unable to serve even one ticket. Carrie first misinformed Jennifer what entrées were on order. Amanda undercooked the halibut, forgot a cod was part of the order, and conflicted with Elise on the fish station, further holding up the kitchen. After Carrie served raw lamb - and only made Ramsay angrier by claiming that she thought it looked cooked - he sent the red team into the dining room to apologize to the diners before kicking them out. In the blue kitchen, Chino struggled with poor handwriting and forgot to offer sides to a table. On appetizers, Tommy burnt chicken tenders and then served them dry, which led to Will taking over for him on garnish. Natalie's beef wellington came out raw, but she recovered quickly, and the blue team, thanks to Natalie and Will's leadership, then finished the red team's service, being deemed clear winners. Elimination: The women nominated Jennifer and Carrie, Ramsay also nominated Amanda. Although both Amanda and Jennifer attempted to blame Carrie for being the main reason for the team's defeat, Ramsay ultimately eliminated Amanda for her poor performance on fish and giving up during service. Amanda's comment: "I'm so completely and utterly embarrassed and disappointed with myself. My dream, coming into Hell's Kitchen, was to win. So to have one of my idols tell me, 'You're not worth it,' that shit sucks." Ramsay's comment: "Amanda lost the will to cook on the line tonight. I lost the will to keep her here."
| 112 | 4 | "14 Chefs Compete" | July 26, 2011 | 6.04 |
Team challenge: Each team had five minutes to capture chickens in a pen, with each one earning an ingredient that could be used for the challenge; each team then had 30 minutes to use a single chicken to cook chicken dishes four ways, using only ingredients earned in the chicken roundup, with Jen Garcia and Dave Karger, the editors of People and Entertainment Weekly magazines, judging. Paul scored on fried as Carrie and Gina's was raw, but Jennifer and Krupa and Jonathon and Will both scored on sauteed. Jamie scored on grilled after Tommy and Monterray dropped half of their chicken, but Elise and Elizabeth beat Chino and Natalie on roasted, giving the red team their first challenge win, 3-2. Reward/punishment: The red team spent the day go-kart racing at K1 Speed. In addition, Elise and Elizabeth's dish was featured in People magazine as the best dish of the challenge. The blue team prepared chickens for the next service. Service: Each kitchen served two former Olympic athletes with Misty May-Treanor and Jen Kessy for the red team, and Janet Evans and Mark Spitz for the blue team. Krupa and Jonathon were assigned to wait the chef's table. Both teams struggled through service. In the blue kitchen, Natalie performed well on appetizers, but Tommy served a caesar salad with too much dressing to the chef's table. Jonathon was berated for loudly throwing the salad in the bin and shouting for another one while Ramsay was reading a ticket. On entrées, Monterray's sea bass fell apart, and he angered Sous Chef Scott by arguing about it. Monterray and Jonathon then started arguing over the latter angrily exclaiming he couldn't help everyone, but Will and Natalie successfully defused it before Ramsay got involved. Chino gave inconsistent timings on when his meat would be ready and, despite Natalie trying to help him, served raw wellingtons. Ramsay then threw the blue team out after Chino served raw lamb and wellingtons with raw pastry. In the red kitchen, Elise served overcooked scallops with no color, forcing Ramsay to show her how to properly cook the scallops. Carrie and Elizabeth had trouble working together on appetizers, which resulted in Carrie miscommunicating to Elise to cook her scallops despite Elizabeth not having her appetizers finished. On entrées, Gina sliced her steak despite Elise being seven minutes away on her sea bass, and she only angered Ramsay further when she laughed after Ramsay sarcastically told her "well done." Elise then served raw and overcooked sea bass, and Ramsay kicked the team out after Gina served raw lamb. Since Ramsay, Scott and Andi had to cook the entrees for the VIP tables, both teams were declared losers and tasked with coming up with two nominees for elimination. Elimination: While in the dorms, Chino attempted to blame Natalie for sabotaging him during service, causing her to break down crying. In addition, Elise and Carrie had a screaming match after the former attempted to claim she had yet to mess up. The blue team nominated Chino and Monterray for their poor performances on their stations, and the red team, despite Gina being the worst performer, nominated Carrie and Elise, feeling their bickering was bringing the team down. Ramsay polled the entire red team and Natalie who all, except for Elizabeth, stated they wished Elise to be eliminated. However, he sent Elise back in line and ultimately eliminated Chino for being a consistently poor performer and his third straight nomination. Chino's comment: "I am disappointed. My expectations were a lot higher. I came here to cook, you know, and it's a shame that I didn't get a chance to cook a little bit more. But I will never sell out. I'll leave this place with my dignity intact." Ramsay's comment: "Chino took his time in Hell's Kitchen very seriously. The problem is, he seriously couldn't cook."
| 113 | 5 | "13 Chefs Compete" | August 1, 2011 | 5.60 |
Team challenge: Chefs from the Moto restaurant in Chicago demonstrated how to make an orange sorbet using oranges, a sound wave generator liquid nitrogen. The chefs then had 45 minutes to make six protein dishes using only fire and water, with Ramsay and the Moto chefs judging. Since the red team had an extra member, they made two prawn dishes before choosing Elizabeth's over Carrie's. The only dishes to score belonged to Jennifer, Will, Gina, and Paul, tying the score at 2. Ramsay declared the blue team winners, as he preferred Carrie's dish over Elizabeth's and nobody noticed that Krupa mistook filet mignon for veal. Reward/punishment: The blue team was rewarded with a spa day at the Montage Hotel in Beverly Hills. The red team cleaned the fountain and hot tub and prepped the kitchens for service. Service: Jennifer and Natalie served tableside halibut sashimi, however, Jennifer started to sweat in the halibut, prompting Ramsay to give her a towel. In the red kitchen, Krupa served soupy risotto and, due to Gina bringing her scallops too soon, also served undercooked spaghetti. After Krupa served a spaghetti with too much sauce in it, Ramsay threw her out. Gina then had a communication breakdown with the rest of the kitchen, resulting in Elise not having her garnish ready when Gina was already walking to the pass. After Gina served raw sea bass, Ramsay threw her and Elise out. In the blue kitchen, Jonathon forgot which garnishes and proteins were to go together, prompting Paul to take over, and Monterray served raw beef wellingtons. Tommy didn't communicate with Monterray on meat and had to refire a cod for a ticket two separate times, which resulted in Monterray overcooking his wellingtons in an attempt to keep them hot. This prompted Ramsay to throw them both out. Both teams finished service, but Ramsay, disappointed by the lack of communication and leadership, declared no winner. Elimination: The red team nominated Krupa and Elise, while the blue team nominated Monterray and Tommy. After Elise and Krupa both named Gina as the weakest cook, Ramsay agreed and eliminated her for disintegrating performances and lack of communication and fightback. Gina's comment: "I do think Chef Ramsay was wrong to let me go. He should have eliminated Elise. She's a big problem on the red team. But I absolutely will walk out of here with my head held high. I gave it everything that I had." Ramsay's comment: "They say good things come in small packages. But unfortunately, in Gina's case, her talent matched her size: tiny."
| 114 | 6 | "12 Chefs Compete" | August 2, 2011 | 6.32 |
Team challenge: Ramsay announced that Hell's Kitchen would host the Culver City High School Class of 1991's 20 year reunion. Both teams prepared a three-course tasting menu for the reunion committee; Elizabeth and Paul were tasked with meeting the committee and relaying the information to their teammates, but Elizabeth misinformed her team into cooking Asian dishes instead of Hawaiian and chose not to mention that one of the judges was pescatarian and did not eat meat, resulting in the red team cooking the wrong dishes and giving the blue team an easy three-zero win. Reward/punishment: The blue team went out to sea on a luxury yacht with Ramsay, and their challenge-winning dishes were added to the menu for service. The red team prepped the kitchens, redecorated the dining room and baked a cake for the reunion. However, Ramsay was not impressed with the cake, calling it a "big Mexican sombrero gone wrong", chose not to serve it. During the punishment, Elise and Elizabeth argued over the latter costing the red team the challenge win. Service: The red team's service was near flawless, due to Elise's strong leadership and Elizabeth's strong performance on fish, their only problem being Carrie bringing appetizers up to the pass early and then Ramsay catching her trying mix an old risotto into a fresh one and reheating it. The blue team served appetizers quickly thanks to Natalie's leadership, but on entrees, Paul held up the kitchen completely by serving raw snapper for the committee table twice, and Monterray was caught cooking garnish in a cold pan. After his second failed attempt at fish, Ramsay kicked Paul off his station for Monterray and Jonathon, but Jonathon did very little to help and was later caught walking around the kitchen with his hands behind his back and not cooking anything. Monterray also served raw snapper, causing an angry Ramsay to threw out the blue team and have the red team finish their service. Elimination: the blue team nominated Monterray and Paul; Ramsay also called up Jonathon. Ramsay sent Paul back in line, even though he was the blue team's worst performer, after hearing his convincing plea, and eliminated Monterray for his third straight nomination and inconsistent performances, but praised him for his efforts. Monterray's comment: "I truly think that Jonny should've been eliminated because he hasn't done anything since he got here. If I'd have known, you know, to stay in the background not cooking anything was the key to stay in Hell's Kitchen, I'd have been did that from the start." Ramsay's comment: "It was high school reunion night in Hell's Kitchen. Unfortunately, for Monterray, he flunked the test."
| 115 | 7 | "11 Chefs Compete" | August 8, 2011 | 6.59 |
Krupa drank too much after the elimination, and woke up the next morning with a hangover. Team challenge: Each team had 45 minutes to cook five dishes containing at least one type of beer, judged by two beer sommeliers, Christina and Hallie. The dishes were to be ranked from worst to best, and the red team dropped Krupa's dish since they had an extra member. Carrie and Elise gave the red team an early lead, but Natalie, Will and Tommy all scored to give the blue team their third consecutive challenge win. Reward/punishment: The blue team attended the 2011 Toyota Grand Prix of Long Beach as VIP guests, and met IndyCar drivers Arie Luyendyk Jr. and Simona de Silvestro. The red team took in deliveries of food, including ice and kegs of beer. Elise's teammates got fed up with her for crying when the punishment was being announced and slacking off during the punishment. Service: Professional football players Andre Carter and Matt Leinart were guests for beer night. In the red kitchen, Elise forgot to drain her salad despite notice from Carrie and caused confusion by yelling out tickets, Jamie served raw sea bass and Krupa served raw venison and overcooked wellingtons. In the blue kitchen, Natalie served rubbery scallops as Ramsay noticed she failed to turn her pan on hot enough, forcing Will to help her. Jonathon sent a wellington with raw pastry and attempted to blame Tommy. He and Natalie were later kicked out for overcooked wellington and raw sea bass, respectively. Both teams finished service, but both were declared losers. Elimination: The blue team nominated Natalie and Jonathon while red team nominated Krupa and Jamie. Ramsay eliminated Krupa for disintegrating after her strong start, but praised her for her heart. Ramsay gave no comment on her elimination. The episode ended in a cliffhanger after Ramsay told the chefs that he was not done. Krupa's comment: "It hurts that I'm eliminated now, and I'm gonna kick myself for this for a very long time. But I have not let anybody back home down, because everybody knows how much I fight for things, and they know how much I have in me."
| 116 | 8 | "10 Chefs Compete" | August 9, 2011 | 6.41 |
In the recap, Krupa's jacket was hung and her picture was burned. Elimination - continued: Ramsay asked each chef to decide who they felt would be the strongest leader in their team. Jennifer and Will received the most votes. Ramsay then asked Jennifer and Will who they felt would be the weakest leader. Jennifer chose Carrie and Will chose Tommy. Team challenge: Each team had 45 minutes to cook five comfort food dishes with a modern twist under the leadership of Carrie and Tommy, judged by Wolfgang Puck. During the cooking process, Carrie had trouble with Elise due to the latter wanting to cook pizza instead of spaghetti, and Jonathon struggled to properly make Tommy's pizza due to Tommy's lack of direction. Jamie's burgers, Natalie's Cobb salad, and Jennifer's chicken noodle soup were the only three dishes to score. The red team clinched a 2-1 win when Jonathon served a pizza with honey and truffle oil in the dough, resulting in it having a puddle on top. Reward/punishment: The red team received a tour of the Sunset Strip, followed by a visit to the Laugh Factory in Hollywood and they each received a set of Demeyere cookware. The blue team prepped both kitchens for service and cleaned the dorms. Jonathon, who was responsible for their loss, irked his teammates further by sitting out most of the punishment due to a proclaimed "neck injury," forcing the red team to finish prepping their own kitchen upon returning from their reward. Service: Servicemen of the United States Coast Guard were guests for service. Carrie stalled the red team on appetizers by not rolling a pizza properly and burning garlic for a risotto, but with Jamie's help managed to recover. The red team then had a perfect performance on entrees thanks to Elise's stellar performance on meat (made even impressive by the fact that almost all entrées ordered that night were meat entrées). In the blue kitchen, Natalie served bland mussels, and Jonathon maintained a lethargic attitude for most of service because of his "neck injury". He tried to cook too much capellini at once then overcooked it twice, remaining lackadaisical and unfocused even with Paul's help. Jonathon attempted to explain his neck pain to Ramsay when brought into the storeroom, but Ramsay angrily reminded him that just because he was in pain didn't mean he had to give up, citing Dave Levey who won season 6 with a broken wrist. Tommy failed to communicate from the meat station before serving two wellingtons at different temperatures, and Ramsay also berated him for laughing after nearly knocking over Natalie when going into his oven. Both teams finished service; the red team were named clear winners, with Ramsay in particular praising Elise for her stellar performance on the meat station. Elimination: Jonathon and Natalie were nominated. Ramsay sent Natalie back in line and eliminated Jonathon for his serious downward spiral, struggling in three consecutive services and his refusal to take responsibility for his mistakes. Jonathon's comment: "This is pretty disappointing. You know, it should've been a different call. Natalie's not gonna be able to hide behind that bullshit too much longer. You know, it's just a matter of time Chef Ramsay's gonna see through it, and, you know, she'll be the next to go." Ramsay's comment: "The only thing worse than the pain in Jonathon's neck was listening to him blame everyone else for all his mistakes. I was glad to put him out of his misery."
| 117 | 9 | "9 Chefs Compete" | August 15, 2011 | 6.99 |
Team challenge: Each contestant had an hour to make a dessert for a romantic dinner. Jordan Kahn, owner of Red Medicine, and Waylynn Lucas judged each dessert on a scale of one to three stars; the team with the most stars would win. Since the red team had an extra member, they had to choose a dessert to not present to the judges. While initially considering Jennifer's due to the smell of alcohol in her dish, they eventually decided on Elise's dessert due to its large portion and unappealing presentation, much to her disdain. Tommy's scored the minimum 2 for having raw dough, while Jamie's only scored 3. Paul scored a perfect 6, but Elizabeth and Natalie also scored 3 each. Carrie and Will each scored only 2, leaving Jennifer to need a perfect 6 to give the red team the win, which she did manage to achieve with her flambeed bananas foster, giving the red team a 14-13 win. Ramsay tasted Elise's dessert afterwards and emphatically agreed with the decision to drop it, as it tasted disgusting due to being drowned in vinegar. Reward/punishment: The red team spent the night at Caesars Palace in Las Vegas and won passes for a future three-day, two-night stay to see Holly Madison's show, as well as signed copies of her book. The blue team decorated and prepped Hell's Kitchen for date night. Service: Tommy seasoned scallops too early and did it again despite Ramsay telling him not to. After Tommy seared a sea bass for a table before they had sent appetizers for it, Ramsay kicked him out to the dining room for a timeout, but he recovered after talking with the customers and managed to serve all his fish perfectly after that. However, Ramsay called him Dumbo for watching Ramsay cook on his station rather than taking over. Paul was thrown out for serving raw chicken, but Natalie and Will both put in strong performances on garnish and appetizers respectively. In the red kitchen, Elise refused to properly communicate with Carrie, and Jamie left a strand of hair in garnish and then served burnt zucchini. Carrie served burnt sea bass, and tried to claim that she hadn't noticed it; she only angered Ramsay further by refusing to go and begging to stay in the kitchen when thrown out. Elise cooked lobster capellini for a vegetarian diner and was thrown out for overcooking oysters. To add further insult, Carrie, Paul, and Elise were all forced to eat the food that got them thrown out. Both teams completed service; the red team was named clear losers. Elimination: The red team nominated Carrie and Elise. However, Ramsay sent both back in line and eliminated Jamie for having gone downhill over the last several services, much to Elizabeth's and Jennifer's dismay. Jamie's comment: "It's not a good feeling to hear from one of the best chefs in the world that I didn't have what it took to stay here. It hurts, deep. It is tough to swallow my pride and walk out those doors. It's one of the hardest things I ever had to do." Ramsay's comment: "Jamie's lack of fight-back told me she's not ready to be a head chef. The remaining chefs need to know it's not about what they've done in the past. It's what they do here that counts."
| 118 | 10 | "8 Chefs Compete" | August 22, 2011 | 6.07 |
Team challenge: The chefs participated in the blind taste test. Carrie and Tommy both scored one, Will scored one while Elizabeth failed to get any and Jennifer and Paul both scored one. Lastly, Elise scored three while Natalie scored one, giving the red team a 5-4 win. Reward/punishment: The red team went horseback riding to the highest point of Hollywood Hills and ate a gourmet lunch with James. The blue team prepped both kitchens for Steak Night and prepared 200 pounds of grapes by hand to make a grape jam for the Hell's Kitchen desserts. During the punishment, Natalie threw a tantrum after Tommy wouldn't stop making grape puns. Service: Service was conducted in two 90-minute shifts; the teams swapped between cooking and serving diners. The red team got to choose to serve first for winning the challenge. Elise wrote a ticket incorrectly, Tommy failed to communicate on appetizers and Natalie overcooked New York strip twice. When a fire erupted on Natalie's station, they were shut down. For the second shift, Tommy was bogged down by poor handwriting. Though Jennifer did well on appetizers, Elise served raw bass, while Carrie held up a table by being slow on mashed potatoes and eventually burning it. The red team was shut down when Elise dropped a bass. Neither team managed to serve all of their tables, so they each had to nominate one member. In particular, Ramsay singled out Tommy and Elise for being poor team players, resulting in an argument between Jennifer and Elise, who fervently defended her performance. Elimination: The red team nominated Carrie and the blue team nominated Tommy. Despite being frustrated with Tommy's lack of voice and somewhat aloof personality, Ramsay ultimately eliminated Carrie for lacking experience, but praised her for her ambition and heart. Carrie's exit was paid in a retrospective montage; Ramsay gave no comment on her elimination. He then told Elise to take off her jacket as the episode ended on a cliffhanger. Carrie's comment: "It's a bitch dealing with Elise. She's had it out for me since day one. But, all the drama aside, I thought I fought hard. I don't have any regrets, because, I mean, cooking with Chef Ramsay has been the most awesome experience I've ever had in my life. The only person I have to blame is myself. That's what just kills me. Because I know I have it inside me, and I didn't do it."
| 119 | 11 | "7 Chefs Compete" | August 22, 2011 | 6.42 |
In the recap, Carrie's jacket was hung and her picture was burned. Elimination - continued: Instead of one, Ramsay had all the chefs remove their jackets and told them that they would be leaving Hell's Kitchen, only to be flown to New York City for a culinary tour around town, followed by a visit to BLT Steak to inspire them. Team challenge: When they returned to Hell's Kitchen, they were presented with a slot machine, which assigned them ingredients and a nationality of cuisine to cook. Each chef was judged on their dishes, and whoever had the best dish would win the challenge for their team. Tommy sat in the chair first but was beaten by Elizabeth who also beat Natalie, whose dish received the worst review for being too spicy. However, Paul, Elise, Will, and Jennifer all got to sit on the high chair in that order, making the red team the first in the show's history to win four challenges in a row. Reward/punishment: The red team was rewarded with a trip to Venice Beach, where they rode in a plastic bubble (aka Zorbing) with James. The blue team prepped both kitchens ahead of service. Service: Tommy served greasy onion rings. Natalie served raw scallops and had sea bass returned for being dry. Elizabeth needed Elise's help on scallops and fired a sea bass when cod was on order, causing Ramsay to send her to the storeroom. Elise's wellingtons fell apart due to being cut too deep and she attempted to blame Tommy for scoring them during prep, despite video footage showing Tommy telling Elise he wrapped her wellingtons but didn't score them. After Elizabeth served raw sea bass and Elise overcooked New York strip, Ramsay kicked them both out. On her way out, Elise kicked down a bin and Ramsay made her pick it up before bombarding her with insults, leaving Jennifer to finish service by herself. Both teams finished service, but Ramsay had them each nominate one chef for elimination. Elimination: The blue team nominated Natalie and the red team nominated Elise. Despite being a major frontrunner, Ramsay eliminated Natalie for her serious downward spiral after joining the blue team and disintegrating performances, but praised her for her energy and heart. Natalie's exit was paid in a retrospective montage. Natalie's comment: "I came to Hell's Kitchen to prove to myself that I'm a good chef. I just couldn't imagine sharing an experience like this with anyone other than the blue team. Hell's Kitchen was one of the hardest things I've ever done in my life. I came in here with the attitude that I can do it, and I never stopped having that attitude. It's definitely disappointing. I obviously came here to win, and deep down, I know I could have done it." Ramsay's comment: "Natalie was lucky enough to get to see BLT Steak in New York. She may get to see it again... as a customer."
| 120 | 12 | "6 Chefs Compete" | August 29, 2011 | 6.21 |
For the first time since season three, Ramsay chose not to merge the final six into a united black team, instead re-igniting the battle of the sexes. Team challenge: The teams were told to cook three entrees; one that would take 30 minutes to cook, one in 20 minutes, and one in 10 minutes. Jennifer scored over Tommy on the 30 minute dish, but Paul scored over Elizabeth in the 20 minute dish. Will then beat out Elise in the 10 minute dish, giving the men a 2-1 win. Elise was berated by Ramsay for crying after he announced the results, telling her to "stop crying and get over it." Reward/punishment: The men were rewarded with a shopping spree at a Ted Baker outlet. The women prepped the kitchens and dining room for service. Service: Before service, Ramsay revealed that every chef surviving elimination after service would be rewarded with a black jacket. For the first time ever, Hell's Kitchen was "closed" for a black-tie charity dinner event, with both teams serving a twelve-top each. Orlando Brown was guest for this service. This service format would become more frequent in later seasons. The women cooked for American Cancer Society while the men cooked for American Humane Association. Each chef took charge of two out of six courses: scallops, risotto, lobster capellini, chicken, lamb Wellington, apple tatin tart. Paul led strongly but tried to serve the scallops without approval from Ramsay, and didn't notice that Tommy had served watery salad. Elizabeth failed to delegate and was non responsive to Jennifer and Elise, which led Jennifer to take over her leadership role. Elise led strongly and got the risotto out with no problems. Tommy fell behind on cooking risotto and tried to add cheese to it before he was supposed to, resulting in three different tasting risottos and needing Will to take control. Will had no problems on capellini, but Elise did very little to help Jennifer with plating, resulting in inconsistent portions; Jennifer kicked Elise off the course and the red team served it late. Paul led strongly on chicken and had no problems, but Elizabeth fired and served the chicken too early, forcing Ramsay to ask James to take the plates while some of the diners were still eating their capellini. To make matters worse, Elizabeth once again struggled in leadership and attempted to slice chicken off the cutting board. On the wellington course, Tommy struggled in leadership but recovered after prompting by Ramsay. Elise led strongly but failed to notice that Jennifer and Elizabeth had served bland mashed potatoes, leading Jennifer and Elise to once again accuse each other of sabotage, an argument made worse by Elise undercooking a pan of apples for Jennifer, who led the dessert course. Will had no problems getting the course out, and the men finished far ahead of the women. Ramsay declared the men the winners and stated that the women would be up for elimination. Elimination: Ramsay gave the men black jackets before having the women step up for elimination. After asking what happened tonight, Elise and Jennifer got into a massive argument over whether each of them led their courses well and whether they had attempted to sabotage each other. After each of them plead their case, Ramsay first gave Jennifer a black jacket and then had Elise and Elizabeth remove their jackets. He then eliminated Elizabeth, feeling she was not ready to lead a brigade, before giving Elise the final black jacket. Elizabeth's comment: "When I stepped foot in Hell's Kitchen, I really wanted to just prove to myself that I could do this. I cooked my ass off. I tried my hardest. I think I am as good of a cook as everybody else in there with black jackets, but it just wasn't my time right now." Ramsay's comment: "Tonight was all about charity in Hell's Kitchen, and after watching Elizabeth's performance, I'm now ready to donate her jacket to a worthy cause."
| 121 | 13 | "5 Chefs Compete Part 1" | September 5, 2011 | 5.89 |
Challenge: The chefs raced around the dining room to collect five plates, each containing the name of an "ugly food", then given 50 minutes to reinvent that dish, to be judged by a panel of five judges: L.A. magazine Dine Editor Lesley Bargar Suter, cookbook author Susie Heller, food stylist Valerie Aikman-Smith, award-winning food photographer Deborah Jones, and the Foundry on Melrose executive chef/owner Eric Greenspan. The judges scored each dish on a scale of one-10 on presentation and taste, for a total possible score of 100. The final ranking was: Will (87), Elise (86), Tommy (74), Paul (60) and Jennifer (52). Reward/punishment: Will rode in a Rolls-Royce to several LA restaurants, and picked Elise, as the runner-up, to go with him. The others did laundry by hand, including Ramsay's jacket. Service: Ramsay announced that for the first time, the final five would compete against chefs who received black jackets during their original appearances on Hell's Kitchen: Ben (season five), Van and Tennille (six), and Jillian and Trev (eight). The teams were tasked with creating their own menus, consisting of four appetizers, four entrees and three desserts, in a one hour time limit. During that time, Will almost walked out of the competition after a huge argument with Elise, though he chose to stay. Actor David Krumholtz attended service. The black jackets put in a strong performance, their only problems being Paul overcooking lobster, Jennifer undercooking garnish and Elise trying to push the other chefs too quickly. Trev became a leader as instructed by Ramsay but made a salad for the wrong ticket, while Van served undercooked lamb and Tennille served raw and overcooked tuna. The black jackets received a 96% approval rating from the diners, compared to the returning chefs' 80%, though Ramsay had them nominate two chefs for elimination. Elimination: The black jackets nominated Jennifer and Elise. Ramsay gave Jennifer a clean jacket and sent Elise back in line, keeping all chefs for winning service. Ramsay's comment: "Tonight's service was the best yet in Hell's Kitchen. Just like the returning chefs received a second chance, I decided to give Elise and Jennifer a second chance as well. Hopefully, they'll make the most of it."
| 122 | 14 | "5 Chefs Compete Part 2" | September 12, 2011 | 5.78 |
Challenge: The chefs were each given a portion of Alaskan salmon and assigned to create a restaurant quality dish, to be judged by Nobu LA general manager Justin Wyborn, Providence co-owner and GM Donato Poto, and Mr Chow maître d' Chris Denton. Each judge gave a score based on how much they would pay for each dish, with the average score determining the winner. Paul won the challenge ($29.67), with Will second ($28.67), Jennifer third ($28.33), Tommy fourth ($25.33), and Elise last ($24.33). Reward/punishment: Paul went on a helicopter trip of LA with Ramsay and ate lunch at the Water Grill, and he chose Tommy to go with him. In addition, his dish was put on the menu for service. The other chefs had to prep Paul's dish and clean the bar. Service: The Jackson 5 singer Tito Jackson was in attendance for service. Jennifer got overwhelmed on appetizers and didn't communicate with the rest of the team. The communication breakdown led Tommy to bring up raw capellini and Elise to be late on her scallops, while Jennifer burned risotto, but she managed to rebound and properly communicate with Elise to get appetizers out. Ramsay decided to make the team work on appetizers and entrees simultaneously to speed things up, but Elise overcooked the salmon and Ramsay decided to send half of one table's entrees out; the other half ended up waiting an additional 15 minutes for their food. Paul attempted to help her, but Elise repeatedly cooked the salmon skin side up instead of down. Tommy served undercooked capellini that Jennifer thought was cooked, but she denied his request to switch stations, and Elise also rejected his help before serving raw sea bass. Ramsay kicked the team out but then brought Will and Paul back in to finish service by themselves. Elimination: The black jackets nominated Jennifer and Elise. (Note: Elise's nomination count ties with Autumn Lewis (season seven), Sabrina Brimhall (eight), Clemenza Caserta (10) and season 12 winner Scott Commings.) Ramsay polled the other three, with Paul and Will voting against Jennifer (thanks to Elise asking them for a promise prior to elimination) and Tommy voting against Elise. Ramsay agreed and eliminated Jennifer for her lack of leadership, though he praised her exceptional cooking ability. After giving up her jacket, Jennifer called out Paul and Will for their actions and gave Elise the middle finger on her way out. (Note: Jennifer would return as a contestant on Season 17, and finish in sixth place.) Jennifer's comment: "You know, I'm tired of being second best. I want to be the best, that's why I came here. You know, to make it this far in Hell's Kitchen, I proved to myself that I can cook. That's the only good thing right now. They get to deal with Elise. I have more passion and more heart than any of these schmucks. They're lucky I'm gone, because I would've kicked all their asses, because I can fucking cook." Ramsay's comment: "Jennifer finally found her voice in Hell's Kitchen. Unfortunately, it was when she was being eliminated."
| 123 | 15 | "4 Chefs Compete" | September 19, 2011 | 6.04 |
Before the challenge, Ramsay surprised the remaining chefs with a visit from their loved ones (Elise's husband, son, and aunt; Tommy's girlfriend and mother; Paul's brother, and Will's mother and wife). Challenge: After eating a dish made by Ramsay, the chefs had to recreate it in 35 minutes. Everyone got the garnish correct, but Paul won by correctly identifying cod and prosciutto, Elise and Will tied for second, correctly identifying prosciutto but not the fish, while Tommy finished last after using monkfish and serrano ham. Reward/punishment: Paul and his brother attended a Los Angeles Dodgers vs. Chicago Cubs baseball game, where they met Tommy Lasorda, Jamey Carroll, Steve Lyons and Don Mattingly. The others had to clean the dorms and move out furniture. Service: Rex Hudler attended as a guest. Each chef took a turn running the pass, while also having to spot acts of sabotage Ramsay and sous chef Scott set up. Paul was strong in leadership and managed to spot Tommy's raw cod. However, he failed to notice Scott putting shrimp in a lobster capellini and had problems with Tommy not communicating time on fish properly. Tommy struggled in leadership by calling inaccurate times and read tickets slowly by not removing them from the pass. He also failed to notice James putting filet on a ticket despite none being on the menu. Elise led well, but she failed to notice potato puree instead of cauliflower, despite tasting it, and started to break down as a result. However, she managed to recover and successfully spot Scott replacing mashed potatoes with parsnip puree, rejecting Tommy's crumbled sea bass. Will was strong in leadership and spotted lamb wellington instead of beef and hanger steak instead of New York strip. However, Elise served raw pasta with the spinach and then attempted to pass off the same spinach on the refire, despite Will telling her to recook it. Elise also argued with Will after he sent back her mashed potatoes for being peppery. The rest of the kitchen then failed to respond to Will when he called out an order, but he managed to quickly retake control and led strongly from then on. Elimination: Ramsay firstly eliminated Tommy, but praised him for his energy and passion. Ramsay then named Will and Paul to advance to the final, eliminating a teary-eyed Elise. (Note: This is the third season to feature an all-male final, after seasons 1 and 6.) (Note: Elise would return as a contestant on Season 17, and finish in seventh place.)Ramsay praised Elise for her resilience, allowing her to keep her jacket. Ramsay did not give a comment on Tommy and Elise's eliminations, and both did not receive the coat hook and burning picture sequence. Tommy's comment: "When I arrived in Hell's Kitchen, my goal was to create some passion and some art. The whole time I was here, I tried to stay true to myself. I don't care about mineral baths and foot massages and rich people. I like chicken wings and domestic beer and motorcycle rides. It's been a learning experience, a humbling experience. At the same time, it was one of the greatest experiences of my life. I'm a culinary juggernaut right now, compared to when I walked in the door. This isn't the end, this is the beginning for me, and I'm just gonna keep on climbing until I conquer the world." Elise's comment: "I came here to prove that I could throw down in a kitchen with the best of 'em. But they was intimidated by my leadership skills from day one I walked in here. I've been slammed. I've been kicked while I'm down, and I still got back up. I fought hard to be here. Thank you, Chef Ramsay, for being hard on me and helping me to improve on my weaknesses. After Hell's Kitchen, I am prepared for any obstacle that comes my way, because nothing can be harder than this."
| 124 | 16 | "2 Chefs Compete" | September 19, 2011 | 5.94 |
Paul and Will prepared a menu featuring four appetizers, four entrées and three desserts, and were given new white jackets. Ramsay then sent them to Belasco Theater with their relatives, where they were greeted by a cheering crowd. Challenge: Paul and Will cooked five dishes to be judged by executives of BLT Steak. Will won 3-2. Reward: Will was granted first pick in drafting a team using the eight chefs eliminated from the competition prior to the final. (Note: Jamie did not return, so Krupa took her place as the last person eliminated prior to the top ten.) Will picked Tommy, Natalie, Jennifer and Krupa, while Paul picked Elise, Elizabeth, Jonathon, and was left with Carrie. Service: Among the guests for service were the final two's relatives and BLT Group President Keith Treyball. In Will's kitchen, Natalie got the kitchen off to a strong start on appetizers, but Krupa repeatedly undercooked and overcooked fish, with one dish being returned for still being under cooked. Will eventually relegated her to desserts and replaced her with Natalie, but Natalie found that Krupa had failed to properly cook or season any of the fish on order, telling Will she was at least eight minutes away on one ticket. In Paul's kitchen, Elise put stock in an appetizer that didn't need it and one of her pans caught on fire, but she recovered. Elizabeth overcooked scallops and Jonathon's steak repeatedly came out raw. As a result, Paul kicked him off the station and replaced him with Elise. Carrie struggled to keep on garnish, so Paul sent Elise over to help her, eventually turning their service around. Winner: Ramsay then chose the winner based on the customer comment cards and his own observations. Ramsay gave Will and Paul final praise before having them step in front of a closed door. Paul's door opened, making him the ninth winner of Hell's Kitchen. Paul dedicated the win to his mother, who died a few months before he came to compete, while Will took his defeat graciously. Will's comment: "It sucks. I much rather would've won. I didn't come out here for second, I came out here for first. But if I had to lose to anybody, man, I'm glad it was Paul." Paul's comment: "I am BLT, $250,000 of a big deal! There's so much emotion going through me. I mean, I'm sad, I'm happy, I'm ecstatic. My mom's looking down on me right now. She knows what I've been through, she knows how hard I've worked. This is all for her. I mean, this is it. This is the greatest achievement I have ever reached in my entire life! I am a big fucking deal!" Ramsay's comment: "Paul won tonight, because he's probably the most passionate, determined chef ever to enter Hell's Kitchen. He'll make a great head chef, because his enthusiasm is contagious. I'm so proud to hand him over to BLT Steak in New York City."
