= Hell's Kitchen (American TV series) season 10 =

Hell's Kitchen
- Season 10
- Region 1 DVD cover
- Hosted by: Gordon Ramsay
- No. of contestants: 18
- Winner: Christina Wilson
- Runner-up: Justin Antiorio
- No. of episodes: 20

Release
- Original network: Fox
- Original release: June 4 – September 10, 2012

Season chronology
- ← Previous; Season 9 Next → Season 11

Season 10 of the American competitive reality television series Hell's Kitchen premiered on Fox on June 4, 2012, and concluded on September 10, 2012. Gordon Ramsay returned as host and head chef, while Scott Leibfried and Andi Van Willigan returned as the Blue Team and Red Team's sous-chefs respectively. James Lukanik returned as maître d'.

The season was won by chef de cuisine Christina Wilson, with sous-chef Justin Antiorio finishing second.

The filming of Season 10 was done in June 2011.

== Contestants ==
18 chefs competed in season 10. Full names per official site.

Contestant	Age	Occupation	Hometown	Result
Christina Wilson	32	Chef de Cuisine	Philadelphia, Pennsylvania	Winner
Justin Antiorio	29	Sous Chef	Lyndhurst, New Jersey	Runner-Up
Dana Cohen (Note: Chef returned to Hells Kitchen again on Season 17, finished at 8th place.)	27	Chef Instructor	River Vale, New Jersey	Eliminated before Finals
Barbra "Barbie" Marshall (Note: Chef returned to Hells Kitchen again on Season 17, finished at 9th place.)	34	Catering Chef	Philadelphia, Pennsylvania	Eliminated before Finals
Clemenza Caserta	41	Executive Chef	Staten Island, New York	Eliminated after Fourteenth Service
Robyn Almodovar (Note: Chef returned to Hells Kitchen again on Season 17, finished at 5th place.)	31	Executive Sous Chef	Hollywood, Florida	Eliminated after Thirteenth Service
Brian Merel	31	Personal Chef	Chicago, Illinois	Eliminated after Twelfth Service
Kimberly "Kimmie" Willis	27	Personal Chef	Memphis, Tennessee	Eliminated after Eleventh Service
Tiffany Johnson	30	Sous Chef	Warren, Vermont	Eliminated after Tenth Service
Royce Wagner	29	Sous Chef	Fort Lauderdale, Florida	Eliminated after Ninth Service
Patrick Cassata	40	Executive Chef	Lombard, Illinois	Eliminated after Eighth Service
Roshni Gurnani	28	Executive Chef	Boston, Massachusetts	Eliminated after Seventh Service
Guy Vaknin	28	Executive Catering Chef	New York, New York	Eliminated after Sixth Service
Danielle Rimmer	27	Saucier	Bayonne, New Jersey	Eliminated after Fifth Service
Don Savage	44	Cafeteria Chef	Houston, Texas	Eliminated after Fourth Service
Briana Swanson	32	Personal Chef	New York, New York	Eliminated after Third Service
Chris Carrero	33	Executive Chef	Queens, New York	Eliminated after Second Service
Tavon Hubbard	22	Executive Chef	Washington, D.C.	Eliminated after First Service

== Contestant progress ==
No.	Chef	Original teams				1st switch				2nd switch				Individuals			Finals
No.	Chef	1001	1002	1003	1004	1005/1006/1007		1008	1009/1010	1011	1012/1013	1014	1015	1016	1017	1018/1019/1020	
1	Christina	WIN	LOSE	LOSE	LOSE	LOSE	WIN	WIN	LOSE	WIN	LOSE	LOSE	WIN	IN	IN	IN	WINNER
2	Justin	LOSE	LOSE	WIN	LOSE	LOSE	LOSE	LOSE	LOSE	LOSE	LOSE	LOSE	NOM (Note: Justin was the only chef not to be nominated by a fellow team member)	IN	IN	IN	RUNNER-UP
3	Dana	WIN	LOSE	LOSE	LOSE	LOSE	WIN	WIN	LOSE	WIN	LOSE	LOSE	WIN	IN	IN	OUT	Christina's team
4	Barbie	WIN	NOM	NOM	LOSE	NOM	WIN	WIN	LOSE	WIN	NOM	LOSE	WIN	IN	NOM	OUT	Justin's team
5	Clemenza	LOSE	LOSE	WIN	LOSE	LOSE	NOM	NOM	LOSE	NOM	NOM	LOSE	NOM	NOM	OUT		Justin's team
6	Robyn	WIN	LOSE	LOSE	LOSE	LOSE	WIN	WIN	NOM	LOSE	NOM	NOM	NOM	OUT			Christina's team
7	Brian	LOSE	LOSE	WIN	NOM	LOSE	LOSE	NOM	LOSE	LOSE	LOSE	LOSE	OUT				Justin's team
8	Kimmie	WIN	LOSE	LOSE	LOSE	LOSE	WIN	WIN	LOSE	WIN	LOSE	OUT					Christina's team
9	Tiffany	WIN	LOSE	LOSE	LOSE	LOSE	WIN	WIN	NOM	WIN	OUT						
10	Royce	NOM	NOM	WIN	LOSE	LOSE	LOSE	LOSE	NOM	OUT							Justin's team
11	Patrick	LOSE	LOSE	WIN	LOSE	NOM	LOSE	NOM	OUT								Christina's team
12	Roshni	WIN	NOM	NOM	NOM	LOSE	LOSE	OUT									
13	Guy	LOSE	LOSE	WIN	LOSE	NOM	OUT										
14	DanieIIe	WIN	LOSE	LOSE	NOM	OUT											
15	Don	NOM	LOSE	WIN	OUT												
16	Briana	WIN	LOSE	OUT													
17	Chris	LOSE	OUT														
18	Tavon	OUT															

Keywords

- WIN = Won the dinner service
- LOSE = Lost the dinner service
- BoB = Best of the Best, usually exempt from nomination
- BoW = Best of the Worst, sometimes exempt from nomination
- IN = not nominated for elimination
- NOM = nominated for elimination
- OUT = eliminated normally
- LEFT = withdrew from competition
- HOSP = eliminated due to hospitalization
- EJEC = eliminated during service

Color key
Chef was eliminated after regular nomination
Chef was eliminated after Ramsay's nomination
Chef was eliminated without nomination
Chef was eliminated from winning team
Chef was eliminated in the Cook For Your Life challenge
Chef was nominated to participate in the Cook For Your Life challenge
Chef was eliminated during service
Chef withdrew from the competition
Chef was the Best of the Best/Worst
Chef was retained after regular nomination
Chef was retained after Ramsay's nomination
Chef's nomination was voided
The winner of Hell's Kitchen
The runner-up of Hell's Kitchen

== Episodes ==
No. overall	No. in season	Title	Original release date	U.S. viewers (millions)
125	1	"18 Chefs Compete"	June 4, 2012	5.46
In this episode, 20 initial chefs were transported to Hell's Kitchen in a police-escorted motorcade, where sous chef Scott greeted them and explained he shaved his head to prove his dedication to Chef Ramsay, as did sous chef Andi. He called for volunteers to shave their heads; two of the "chefs" then turned out to be Scott's friends instead and got their heads shaved. Scott then called out actual contestant Danielle and was about to shave her head before Ramsay stopped him. It was later revealed that Andi was wearing a bald cap. Team challenge/signature dish: Each chef created their signature dish; men (blue team) competed against women (red team). Robyn's seared striped bass scored over Don's Southwestern saltimbocca (Don's dish had too much cumin), neither Tiffany's lamb schnitzel nor Guy's pan-seared striped bass scored a point (Tiffany's dish was compared to a wet diaper and described as "utter wank", and Guy told Ramsay not to try his dish as he burned his sauce and his dish was described as fish sundae), Roshni's coriander-crusted rack of lamb and Royce's pan-seared grouper both scored points (Royce also revealed that he works for Season 1 runner-up Ralph Pagano), Justin's dish scored over Danielle's spaghetti and shrimp, neither Kimmie's Fisherman's Trio nor Brian's dessert scored a point, as well as Barbie and Chris' dishes (Barbie's potatoes were soggy, and Chris' dish was bitter and burnt), Briana's duck and Patrick's antelope both scored a point, and Dana's pan-seared scallops scored over Tavon's fettuccine with shrimp, scallops and crab (Tavon's dish had too much vinegar). Lastly, Christina's molasses-glazed pork chop scored over Clemenza's stuffed veal chop, giving the women a 5-3 win. Reward/punishment: The women had a steak dinner on the patio, prepared by Hell's Kitchen winners Rahman "Rock" Harper from Season 3 and Dave Levey from Season 6, while the men had to clean both kitchens. Service: Leigh Bodden was a guest for opening night. In the women's kitchen, Roshni was kicked out after undercooking and overcooking scallops, and although Barbie led the women to getting appetizers out, Christina's Wellingtons came out raw. In the men's kitchen, Tavon served raw pigeon, butchered the entire team's supply of scallops, and laughed after being scolded by Ramsay, getting him kicked out. Royce had trouble finding anchovies for salads and was also kicked out for serving undercooked spaghetti against Clemenza's advice. Don did little, annoying his teammates, and the rest of the team was kicked out after Chris served an onion tart with raw pastry. After Christina still struggled on Wellingtons, Ramsay shut the women's kitchen down. Though no entrées were served, the women were named winners for at least serving all their appetizers, while the men didn’t serve a single appetizer. The men were told to nominate two for elimination. Elimination: Tavon and Don were nominated. However, Ramsay overruled Don's nomination as the latter didn't have anything to cook (due to the appetizers not being served), and nominated Royce. In the end, Chef Ramsay sent Royce back in line and eliminated Tavon for failing to live up to his executive chef position, as well as being the worst performer of the night. Tavon's comment: "Being the first to be eliminated sucks, of course. Nobody wants to go home first, but I did what I did, I messed up. But now, I'm looking forward to sitting on my couch and see Royce's ass go the fuck home next week." Ramsay's comment: "Tavon may be an executive chef at 22, but he did little to impress me in his short stay in Hell's Kitchen."
126	2	"17 Chefs Compete"	June 5, 2012	4.87
A rap group wakes the chefs up inside the dorms. Team challenge: Each team removed 125 scallops from a large mound of ice and seaweed before cooking them to Ramsay's standards; the first team to make six plates of five scallops would win. The women won, mainly thanks to Barbie and Tiffany, preparing six plates to the men's two. Reward/punishment: The women went on a yacht cruise for a day on Santa Catalina Island, and went ziplining, during which Roshni got stuck, stalling the line. The men cleaned the main entrance, prepped prawns for service, and had smoothies made from rejected scallops for lunch. During the punishment, Royce criticized the rest of the men for their lackadaisical attitudes, which he believed was the reason for their loss. Service: The service was deemed "Redemption Night", with Ramsay specifically wanting flawless scallops from both kitchens. Brian and Christina served shrimp scampi appetizer tableside. In the men's kitchen, Don served a pizza that was burnt on top and raw on the bottom, Brian served raw and also overcooked shrimp, Chris needed his teammates' help with scallops and served raw opah and Royce served bland mashed potatoes. For the women, Briana served risotto of three different colors in three different pans. Robyn and Barbie did not work well together, burning scallops and also bringing up the wrong number. Barbie continually argued with her teammates and overcooked a bass. Ramsay kicked the women out after catching Tiffany asking Danielle to cook six bass not to order. After Clemenza brought up an overcooked steak from the men's kitchen, Ramsay kicked the men out as well and named both teams losers. Elimination: The women nominated Barbie and Roshni while the men nominated Chris and Royce. Despite the women's strong desire to see Barbie go home due to her poor attitude and poor performance, Ramsay first sent both Roshni and Royce back in line, then sent Barbie back in line as well and instead eliminated Chris for his awful performance on fish and for admitting he was "frazzled" during service. Chris's comment: "Hell's Kitchen is brutal. It's tough. Chef Ramsay's intimidating, you know? And I just cracked under the pressure." Ramsay's comment: "I'm sure that Chris prays that he never sees another scallop. And after tonight, I pray I don't see any more of him."
127	3	"16 Chefs Compete"	June 11, 2012	6.25
Rude awakening: The chefs were rudely awakened at 5:47 in the morning to a loud sound of stomping in the dorms, which turned out to be Barbie stomping around while she was doing the dishes. This led to a fight involving Tiffany, Robyn and herself, with the former two threatening to hurt her. Team challenge: Both teams had to cook a meal for 60 immigrants who had just become U.S. citizens. Barbie attempted to cook pizzas before appetizers were served and was removed from her station after burning one, while Clemenza undercooked his. Royce was slow to assemble California Cobb salads for the men, getting reprimanded for using mushrooms, and Brian served raw beef sliders. The women beat the men by three tables, for their third challenge in a row. (Note: The men's loss meant they set a record for the worst start in Hell's Kitchen history, with five lost challenges/services out of five.) Reward/punishment: The women went on a safari trip and had lunch with Ramsay in San Diego. The men were sent to break down a fallen tree at the Ballona Wetlands. Prior to service, Ramsay had Season 1 runner-up Ralph Pagano, Royce's boss, give Royce a pep talk over the phone. Service: A group of Marines and firefighters were guests for this service. Don and Tiffany were assigned as servers, but Don's poor writing and bad spelling slowed the men down. The men had a strong start as Royce had a near-perfect performance on appetizers, but Clemenza, despite cooking lamb perfectly, struggled to tell Ramsay exactly when it would be ready. He then ruined a ticket due to his wellingtons coming out undercooked and then ran out of wellingtons for the six top of Marines, so Ramsay sent him out into the dining room to ask the Marines if they'd like the steaks instead. After this, the men completed service without any further problems. The women got off to a bad start as Dana first put too much sauce in an order of spaghetti, Barbie undercooked scallops, and Briana then struggled to time them with Dana's appetizers. With Christina's help, the women served appetizers, but on entrees, Briana served cod missing half a portion. Kimmie started well, but undercooked Wellingtons, while Roshni forgot an order of dumplings and then served them undercooked. After Briana overcooked cod, Ramsay threw the women out. The men were named clear winners and Ramsay praised Royce, while berating all the women except for Christina. Elimination: Robyn nominated Briana and Barbie, but Chef Ramsay also nominated Roshni. In the end, he eliminated Briana for her lack of fightback and failing to show improvement across three services. Briana's comment: "I came here to Hell's Kitchen to challenge myself. I don't think Chef Ramsay really got to see what kind of chef I am. I'm a very passionate chef. But he didn't think that I was enough of a fighter about it, and he's probably right." Ramsay's comment: "Tonight, Briana had a battle with the cod, and the cod won. And that's why her time in Hell's Kitchen was a short one."
128	4	"15 Chefs Compete"	June 12, 2012	5.32
Ramsay woke the chefs early and took them to a sheep pen at a local farm. Team challenge: Each chef retrieved as many ingredients off sheep as possible, with the collars and paint indicators of each ingredient. They then split into pairs to create four different lamb dishes; as the men were short one member, Patrick worked on his own. Tiffany and Danielle and Clemenza and Don both earned a point on lamb chop, Roshni and Kimmie's ground lamb earned a point over Patrick's and Justin and Guy's rack of lamb earned a point over Barbie and Robyn's due to their lamb being raw (which Robyn blamed her teammates for convincing her to take it out for fear of overcooking). Lastly, Royce and Brian's lamb steak earned a point over Christina and Dana's, giving the men their first challenge win, 3-2. Reward/punishment: The men went to watch a horse race at Hollywood Park Racetrack. The women had to give the sheep baths, followed by cleaning and prepping both kitchens, and had lamb testicles for lunch. Service: In the women's kitchen, Danielle undercooked and underseasoned a risotto, while Roshni served raw wellingtons twice and was thrown out. For the men, Brian ran out of cod before being thrown out for calling Ramsay "baby". Ramsay then threw Don out for overcooking steak, followed by Robyn and Danielle for communication issues on garnish, and Justin and Royce for both cooking bass for the same table. Service was completed, but both teams were named losers. Elimination: The men nominated Don and Brian while the women nominated Roshni and Danielle. Ramsay eliminated Don for his lack of improvement over four services. Don's comment: "I thought that I would be able to come out here and, you know, that he would just love my food, and, you know, I thought I was more of a perfectionist than I was." Team change: Following Don's elimination, Ramsay transferred Roshni to the men, hoping a new environment would change her performance after being nominated three times in a row. Ramsay's comment: "Everyone in Hell's Kitchen starts at the bottom. Unfortunately, Don stayed there."
129	5	"14 Chefs Compete"	June 18, 2012	5.65
Team challenge: Sous chef Scott brought a large donkey piñata to the teams and Ramsay explained that the piñata would pour out balls with ingredients labelled on them. Each team had to grab 25 ingredients to split among seven Mexican dishes, then choose five to be judged by Ramsay and Chefs Thomas Ortega and John Sedlar. Kimmie scored over Royce on tacos (much to the chagrin of Brian, whose tacos were dropped), Clemenza scored over Danielle on burritos, Tiffany scored over Justin on soup, and Patrick scored over Christina on enchiladas. For the final round, the guest judges could not decide between Dana’s tostada and Roshni's. Ramsay broke the tie in Dana's favor and noted her dish as the best of the day, giving the red team a 3-2 win. Dana's tostada was also on the menu for that night's dinner service. Reward/punishment: The red team went to Sedlar's restaurant Rivera for lunch and took salsa dancing lessons. The blue team had to prep both kitchens, make handmade salsa for service, and eat tripe for lunch. In the dorms, Royce complained to Danielle that Kimmie's tacos were not authentic as she used flour tortillas, and that he should've won the point over her. Tiffany mistook Royce for Dana, Christina, and Danielle, and informed Kimmie and Robyn that the trio had badmouthed Kimmie's dish, causing animosity to build in the red team. Service: The service was Mexican night. The blue team started badly with Guy delivering undercooked tuna, but he recovered. On the red team, Barbie served incorrectly seasoned mussels and Kimmie baffled Ramsay by putting meat and fish on the same tray. Several chefs were kicked out; Guy and Patrick for overcooking meat and communication issues, Justin and Clemenza after Justin served raw pork despite Clemenza's warning, Royce for serving burnt chicken, Danielle for serving raw pork twice, Barbie for using a thermometer to check a chicken, and Tiffany for serving burnt mashed potatoes. The remaining chefs (Brian and Roshni in the blue kitchen and Kimmie, Robyn, Dana, and Christina in the red kitchen) finished service, but Ramsay again named no winner. Elimination: The blue team nominated Patrick and Guy while the red team nominated Barbie and Danielle. Ramsay sent Barbie back in line, but the episode then ended in a cliffhanger.
130	6	"13 Chefs Compete, Part 1"	June 19, 2012	5.34
Elimination - continued: Patrick was sent back in line and Ramsay eliminated Danielle for her second consecutive awful service. Ramsay did not give a comment on Danielle's elimination and she did not receive a coat hook and burning picture scene. Danielle's comment: "I'm honestly... I'm pissed off. I don't deserve to go home. Kimmie and Barbie, they're sneaky, they're out for themselves, they're fake. I would love to see Dana win. She's a strong cook, and I hope that she makes it to the end." Team challenge: Both teams prepared an appetizer and two entrées (seafood and poultry) for three fashion designer judges; David Meister, Amanda Che, and Ina Soltani. Christina and Dana's appetizer scored over Brian and Justin's, but Roshni and Patrick's poultry dish scored over Barbie and Tiffany's. Clemenza, Royce and Guy's seafood dish then beat out Kimmie and Robyn's, giving the blue team the win. Reward/punishment: The blue team was rewarded with a shopping spree at Malibu Country Mart, followed by lunch at Rosenthal Vineyard. The red team had to assemble the runway and decorate for Hell's Kitchen's first-ever fashion show. Pre-service: Ramsay chose Kimmie and Royce to assist with plating dishes. Clemenza started cooking scallops before the show started, and, upon questioning, Ramsay found out he cooked four servings as the episode ends with a "To be continued" cliffhanger.
131	7	"13 Chefs Compete, Part 2"	June 25, 2012	5.66
Pre-service - continued: Despite Clemenza's mistake, Ramsay ordered Hell's Kitchen to be opened. Service: The red team beat out the blue team on appetizers as Clemenza got overwhelmed with the number of scallop orders, but redeemed himself on entrées. Barbie and Tiffany served raw scallops and Guy overcooked scallops in the blue kitchen. Guy got distracted by the models and was scolded, while Robyn ran out of beef, and was scolded for asking Christina to get some from the blue kitchen and was eventually forced to apologize to the customers and offer them a different entree. Tiffany undercooked swordfish and then tried to blame it on Christina, while Guy undercooked beef and Royce struggled plating food. Both teams completed service, but Ramsay discovered a leftover tray of swordfish, resulting in an argument between Clemenza and Royce over who was responsible. The red team was named winners, with Kimmie being named best of the night. Elimination: The blue team immediately decided on Clemenza as their first nominee and, despite considering nominating Brian for not doing enough to help Clemenza on the fish station, ultimately decided on Guy as their second nominee. While the blue team all blamed Clemenza, Ramsay sent him back in line and eliminated Guy for his lack of fight-back, but praised him for his hard work. Guy's comment: "I never thought that I would be eliminated this early in the game. Chef Ramsay definitely made the wrong decision. I stand behind everything that I did, and I stand behind every dish that I put out there. I thought he would respect that, and apparently, he doesn't." Ramsay's comment: "Guy's performance in Hell's Kitchen was extremely inconsistent. And that is why I know he is not the guy to run Gordon Ramsay Steak."
132	8	"12 Chefs Compete"	June 26, 2012	5.51
Team challenge: In front of each team were four domes and each dome contained six ingredients. Every five minutes, one dome became available for use. Each team member had take one ingredient from the dome to go with their protein and were judged by three Michelin-starred chefs, Michael Cimarusti, Anita Lo and Douglas Keane, who would rate each dish on a scale of 1-3 stars. Tiffany and Justin each scored 6 stars on monkfish and Barbie and Clemenza tied at 5 stars for chicken. Kimmie's turkey was underseasoned while Roshni's was dry, each scoring the minimum 3 stars. Brian and Dana also tied with 6 stars for the veal chop. Patrick then scored 6 stars for his pork tenderloin while Robyn scored the minimum of 3 stars after she admitted to the judges that she hated beets and didn't want to use them. The red team won 30-29 after Royce scored the minimum of 3 stars for leaving both a hair and the digestive tract on his lobster tail, while Christina's scored 7, with Anita being the only judge to award any dish 3 stars. Reward/punishment: The red team was rewarded with a spa day at SLS Hotel in Beverly Hills and each received a set of Demeyere cookware. In addition, Christina's dish was placed on the menu for dinner service. The blue team prepped both kitchens and cleaned the dorms. Service: Tito Ortiz and Sugar Ray Leonard were seated at the chef's tables, with Robyn and Justin supervising them. The red team had little trouble except for Christina undercooking risotto and Tiffany having trouble on meat, including using a dirty knife to check a Wellington, but the team rebounded. In the blue kitchen, Clemenza served hard pasta, Brian served soupy risotto, although both rebounded. However, Roshni served raw and overcooked meat and Ramsay kicked the blue team out after Patrick served cold lobster twice. Ramsay had the red team complete their service. Elimination: Brian and Clemenza were nominated, but Ramsay disagreed that the appetizer station was responsible for the service failure, so he overruled and nominated Roshni and Patrick. The rest of the team was polled on who should go, with everyone voting that Roshni should go except for Royce who wanted Patrick to leave. Ramsay agreed and eliminated Roshni for her irregular performances, but praised her for her big heart. Roshni's comment: "I'm extremely disappointed. I'm not in Hell's Kitchen anymore. It's a competition, and I'm definitely not the weakest. I never got involved in the drama. I never got involved in all the bullshit. I was here for a purpose. I just don't think I got enough time to prove it." Ramsay's comment: "Roshni is a small lady with a big heart. Unfortunately, her performance tonight matched her stature."
133	9	"11 Chefs Compete Part 1"	July 2, 2012	5.83
Following Roshni's elimination, the battle of the sexes was re-ignited. Team challenge: A slot machine determined what type of ingredients and steak one member of each team had to cook in 30 minutes. Since Kimmie did not spin due to the women having an extra member, she got to choose which batch of ingredients she would cook with; she chose Robyn's, but Robyn's ribeye steak was chosen over Kimmie's. Justin's filet mignon scored over Tiffany's, Christina's hangar steak scored over Royce's, neither Dana's or Patrick's flat iron steak scored a point and both Barbie's and Brian's New York strips scored a point. Clemenza's ribeye steak then scored over Robyn's, giving the men a 3-2 win. Ramsay told the women they should have chosen Kimmie's steak, which he preferred. Reward/punishment: The men were rewarded with a kitchenware shopping spree at Sur La Table, followed by lunch at Comme Ça in Hollywood. The women took in a delivery of half a cow and prepped the beef for the next service. Kimmie's injury: Dinner service was a combination of steakhouse and family night. Shortly before service, Kimmie burned her hand and arm with hot grease; while she was medically treated, she argued with Robyn. The episode then ended in another "To be continued" cliffhanger.
134	10	"11 Chefs Compete Part 2"	July 3, 2012	5.07
Kimmie's injury - continued: Despite being advised by the medic not to take part in service, Kimmie decided to, which led to her team (except Robyn) praising her dedication. Service: Tiffany burned pizzas for the kids and served inconsistent blinis for smoked salmon, but Barbie took over and served perfect appetizers, earning praise from Ramsay, which annoyed Tiffany. Kimmie and Robyn continued to argue and failed to get entrées out due to disagreeing over times. In the men's kitchen, Patrick and Royce were thrown out for serving raw meat and Brian was scolded for acting goofy. Ramsay called Clemenza, Brian and Justin to assist the women, but the fighting among the women continued and Ramsay threw them out after Robyn served raw steak. Although the men finished both teams' services, Ramsay named both teams losers but praised Clemenza, Brian and Justin for their efforts indicating none of them would be eliminated. Elimination: The men nominated Patrick and Royce while the women nominated Tiffany and Robyn, after Robyn and Kimmie's feud reached a boiling point and required the rest of the team to intervene. Ramsay sent both Tiffany and Royce back in line and eliminated Patrick for his serious downward spiral over the past several services, failing to live up to his executive chef position and inconsistent performances. Patrick's comment: "You know, I had higher expectations going into this. My family's gonna be disappointed and a little sad for me, but opportunity comes along, and you gotta grab onto it and try. It'll be great to go home, though, and see my wife and kids, I'll tell you that." Team change: Ramsay then accepted Robyn's request to be transferred to the men, though he warned her to stop blaming others for her mistakes. Ramsay's comment: "Patrick talked a good game, but he couldn't back it up with his cooking, so it was time for him to leave Hell's Kitchen."
135	11	"10 Chefs Compete"	July 9, 2012	6.01
Team challenge: Each team member rolled a 12-sided die, with each face having a letter, and had to think of a food item beginning with that letter, after which each team had to produce one dish using all the ingredients named. (Note: Clemenza chose heirloom tomato, Justin chose daikon, Robyn chose dragonfruit, Brian chose edamame and Royce chose chicken. For the red team, Tiffany chose chicory, Barbie chose lamb, Kimmie chose turnips, Dana chose brussels sprouts and Christina chose truffles.) The blue team narrowly won after the red team's brussels sprouts were overcooked. Reward/punishment: The blue team flew to Las Vegas, where they spent the night at the Paris Las Vegas. The red team spent all night barbecuing a pig to make pulled pork, with an alarm sounding every hour. Service: Chef's tables were featured in this service. The blue team cooked for two American Idol contestants which include Season 9 winner Lee DeWyze and Season 10 finalist Haley Reinhart while the red team cooked for David Beckham and his son Brooklyn Beckham with Dana being assigned by Ramsay to supervise their table. Jay Glazer was also in attendance for this service. The red team had a near flawless service, thanks to Barbie's excellent performance on meat, with the only problems being Dana and Christina recovering after initially struggling on making the flatbreads, and Tiffany mistaking cod for sea bass twice. However, the blue kitchen had a terrible dinner service from the start. On appetizers, Clemenza forgot to drain his scallops, though he managed to recover, and Brian struggled to make flatbreads until Robyn helped him. Thanks to Robyn, the blue team was able to successfully serve most of their appetizers. However, they failed to serve any entrées, with Royce first serving three wellingtons at different temperatures, thus causing Ramsay to flip the ticket, and then giving inconsistent times for his pork chop and New York strips. Ramsay then marched the entire blue team (except Robyn) into the storeroom and told them to get a grip and regroup. However, Royce overcooked the pork this time, while Clemenza served a burnt cod on the same ticket. After Royce told Ramsay he was ten minutes away on the refired pork chop, Ramsay brought the red team, who had just finished serving their entrées, into the blue kitchen to help them. Despite Tiffany arguing with Brian on garnish, the blue team managed to serve all their entrées including the chef's tables and Jay Glazer with the red team's help and under Christina's leadership. The red team were named the clear winners and Barbie was named best of the night. Ramsay berated the blue team, except for Robyn. Elimination: Royce and Clemenza were nominated. Ramsay had them both remove their jackets and eliminated Royce for failing to live up to his abilities and his mentor. He then gave Clemenza a clean jacket. Royce's comment: "Of course I'm not okay with leaving. I know I'm better than everybody else. I came here driven, focused. I pushed myself. I don't think I deserve to be standing here." Ramsay's comment: "Royce came in, promising a Rolls-Royce service. But instead, his service was like a broken-down car. Time to send Royce to the junkyard."
136	12	"9 Chefs Compete Part 1"	July 16, 2012	6.33
Two chefs from each team competed against competitive eater Joey Chestnut in a chicken wing contest; Brian/Justin and Barbie/Tiffany had 60 wings to eat between them, while Chestnut had 60 to himself. The first to finish won $500 in cash; Chestnut won. Team challenge: The annual "blind taste test" then took place; since the red team had an extra member, Kimmie sat out. Brian identified three ingredients correctly compared to Christina's two, Barbie scored one while Robyn failed to get any, and Tiffany also scored one while Clemenza also failed to get any. Lastly, Dana scored two, but Justin became the first chef in Hell's Kitchen history to get a perfect score of four, giving the blue team a 7-6 win. Reward/punishment: The blue team spent the day at the Raging Waters water park in San Dimas. The red team spent the day taking in deliveries, grinding peppercorns with a mortar and pestle, changing the oil in the fryers, and peeling potatoes. During the punishment, Kimmie got into a heated argument with Barbie about how little work she was doing and Barbie insulted Kimmie's weight. Pre-service: The teams received an iPad video message from Ramsay, instructing them to create their own menus, consisting of three appetizers, three entrées and three desserts. Barbie prepped at a slow pace, annoying her teammates, the first batch of Kimmie's barbecue sauce tasted awful, forcing Christina to help her, and Dana helped Tiffany with potatoes since they were crunchy, while Clemenza stepped out of prep to clean his jacket. Ramsay had issues with the red team's appetizers, but had positive comments about their entrées. By contrast, Ramsay did not like any of the blue team's dishes, eventually finding several bones in Clemenza's quail dish, leading him to threaten Clemenza with elimination before service. The episode then ended with another "To be continued" cliffhanger.
137	13	"9 Chefs Compete Part 2"	July 17, 2012	6.02
Pre-service - continued: Ramsay warned the blue team to step up their game. Service: The customers submitted comment cards based on which team's dishes they preferred. Robyn undercooked and overcooked Justin's stuffed squash blossoms and was forced to suggest an alternative to the diners after the blue team ran out of scallops. Brian forgot onion rings for Justin's steak and brought them up soggy, Justin overcooked prime steak, and Clemenza lied to Ramsay after forgetting a sea bass. After Brian brought up raw sea bass, Ramsay kicked the blue team out and had sous chef Scott finish the last ticket. For the red team, Christina got overwhelmed on flatbreads, Kimmie overcooked duck and ribeye steak, Dana's lobster was sent back for being raw, and Tiffany cooked garnish in a dirty pan. Tiffany got stalled on raw potatoes for her gratin dauphinoise dish, and argued with sous chef Andi, who kicked her out. Despite the red team finishing service, Ramsay tore up the customers' comment cards and named both teams losers, describing that night's service as their worst so far, and was disappointed that everyone made mistakes on menus they all created. Elimination: The blue team nominated Robyn and Clemenza while the women nominated Tiffany and Barbie, but Ramsay believed the women's second nominee should have been Kimmie. Although he was disappointed with Clemenza for lying and Robyn for not getting along with her new teammates, Ramsay eliminated Tiffany for her lack of passion, standards and leadership. Tiffany's comment: "I never thought I'd be kicked out of this competition this early. Hell's Kitchen is harder than I thought it would ever be. I wish I could've made it to the top two. I tried my hardest. Chef Ramsay, I'm sorry that I didn't prove myself as a leader tonight. But I know that I am, and, you know, hopefully, one day he'll see that." Ramsay's comment: "The most passionate I ever saw Tiffany was moments ago when she was already on her way out. That was just too late."
138	14	"8 Chefs Compete"	July 23, 2012	6.46
Team challenge: A southern gospel choir, the Southern Voices of Victory, serenaded the chefs with their rendition of This Little Light of Mine before the challenge. The teams split into pairs to cook a modernized version of a Southern entrée and side item. One chef could select an opponent to cook against, and the opponent had to pick a fan held by a choir member to reveal the dish. They then had 30 minutes to cook the dishes and were judged by Ramsay and Epicurious editor Tanya Steel. Barbie scored over Clemenza on catfish and collard greens, and Kimmie scored over Brian on pork chop and grits. Justin beat Christina on fried chicken and mac'n'cheese, but Dana scored over Robyn on meatloaf and sweet potatoes, giving the red team a 3-1 victory. Reward/punishment: The red team was rewarded with a photo shoot for Epicurious, followed by lunch at Four Seasons Hotel in Beverly Hills. Dana's dish was judged to be the best of the day, and thus featured on Epicurious. The blue team prepped for service, which involved baking biscuits and churning butter from scratch. Service: Service featured a special menu of Southern cuisine. In the blue team, Brian overcooked oysters on appetizers, but he managed to recover and the blue team was able to send appetizers out. On entrées, Brian burned catfish and gave Ramsay a snide answer when Ramsay asked him to taste it. As a result, Ramsay kicked him out, and Brian nearly walked out the front door, but after prompting by maître d' James, Brian returned and fought back. However, Robyn served undercooked fried chicken twice, causing Ramsay to throw the blue team out. In the red kitchen, appetizers ran well, but Kimmie burned catfish and Barbie served under seasoned garnish. After Kimmie again served burned and undercooked catfish, Ramsay threw the red team out, leaving him and the sous chefs to complete service. Furious, Ramsay ordered both teams to nominate one chef for elimination. Elimination: The red team nominated Kimmie and the blue team nominated Robyn. Despite the Blue Team openly stating that Robyn should go, Ramsay sent Robyn back in line and eliminated Kimmie for not living up to her expertise on southern cooking, but praised her for her passion and drive. Kimmie's comment: "I'm disappointed in myself. It was not my time to go by any means. Definitely Barbie should be going home right now. You know, she's been up five or six times. This is the first time I've ever been up there. And I have so much fight, and I've learned so much. I thought I was going to the top. I thought I was gonna be his head chef, and I guess I just didn't accomplish that." Ramsay's comment: "As a woman from Memphis, tonight's Southern cuisine menu should've been an easy walk in the park for Kimmie. But it turned out to be a difficult uphill battle, and that is why it was her time to go."
139	15	"7 Chefs Compete"	July 24, 2012	6.23
Team challenge: The chefs had to prepare three dishes (risotto, cod, rack of lamb) from the regular Hell's Kitchen menu in a tag-team race. Ramsay then judged the dishes on completeness, taste and appearance. The red team burnt their risotto while the blue team undercooked theirs. Clemenza forgot to put broth in the cod, while Christina undercooked it. Finally, the blue team's lamb had an awful tasting sauce, while Barbie severely mangled the lamb for the red team, resulting in both teams losing the challenge for the first (and so far only) time in the history of Hell's Kitchen. Punishment: The reward would have been a day at the beach in Santa Monica with a helicopter tour of Malibu. Instead, both teams were forced to detail the SUVs, clean the main entrance, and prepare for that night's service. Ramsay also made it very clear that that night's service needed to be redemption after back to back poor services, and warned if it was not excellent, he was not going to wait until the end to eliminate someone. Service: To inspire the chefs to bounce back after a miserable challenge, Ramsay announced that the first team who completed service would win the first black jackets of the season. For the red team, Christina cooked too much risotto and then nearly mixed the leftover portions into a fresh one before Ramsay stopped her. She also refused Barbie's help and then served a burned portion of risotto, though appetizers ran smoothly after that. Thanks to Barbie on meat, the red team rebounded & finished strong well ahead of the blue team on entrees, with the only problem being Dana needlessly cooking three bass in separate pans. In the blue kitchen, Clemenza used three pans to cook five orders of risotto, resulting in them turning out different colors, though appetizers ran well after. However, Brian on the meat station proved incapable of getting any entrees out, first serving raw steak and poorly sliced wellingtons. For the refire, Justin reheated the bass he previously served, and Brian served three Wellingtons at different temperatures, losing his composure soon after. Robyn was also reprimanded by Ramsay for putting her cooked garnishes in the oven and then blaming her team for it, saying that her team had told her it was the "holding oven." Due to the repeated problems, some of the blue team's tables walked out. After Brian served overcooked wellingtons and his steak came out raw, Ramsay kicked him off the station and replaced him with Barbie from the red team, who produced perfectly-cooked steaks and wellingtons thereby allowing the blue team to serve their entrees. The red team were named clear winners for their almost-flawless dinner service and Christina, Dana and Barbie were given black jackets. (Note: The blue team set the worst competitive record of any blue team in the history of Hell's Kitchen dinner services. They were victorious only once in twelve services, losing five outright to the red team as well as suffering six joint losses.) Elimination: The blue team nominated Robyn, but could not choose between Brian and Clemenza, so Ramsay nominated the entire team. Clemenza and Justin were given black jackets before Robyn was given the final black jacket, and Brian was eliminated for giving up easily in service and not having a more serious attitude. Brian's comment: "I'm shocked that I'm going home. You know, with six people left, I thought that there was nowhere to go for me but up. I think I had a shot at winning. I really do. It's a terrible, terrible feeling to know that you got so close, but then just lost it at the end." Ramsay's comment: "Brian had a lot of energy, and he was a funny guy. But after tonight's performance, I wasn't laughing. And that's why he has to leave Hell's Kitchen."
140	16	"6 Chefs Compete"	August 13, 2012	6.58
Team challenge: The chefs were split into pairs (Barbie/Justin, Christina/Robyn and Clemenza/Dana) and had to taste Chefs Ludo Lefebvre and Quinn Hatfield's dishes. This led to the actual "taste it, make it" challenge, in which the chefs had to distinguish the ingredients in Ramsay's dish and reproduce it in 30 minutes. Dana and Clemenza made a veal chop wrapped in prosciutto with white bean horseradish puree and madeira sauce, while the other two pairs wrapped their veal chops in serrano ham, seasoned their purees with smoked bacon, and finished with port sauce. The bacon turned out to be prosciutto and the puree included smoked bacon, which meant that the challenge would be decided on the sauce. Ramsay revealed the alcohol to be madeira, giving Clemenza and Dana the win. Reward/punishment: Clemenza and Dana went jet-skiing and had a gourmet picnic lunch at Silverwood Lake. The others cleaned the dining room, ironed the tablecloths, and polished the flatware. Justin also had to iron James' shirts and Ramsay's chef's jackets. Service: The chefs competed against another team, composed of runners-up from previous seasons of Hell's Kitchen: Russell Kook II (Season 8), Jay Santos (Season 7), Kevin Cottle (Season 6), Paula DaSilva (Season 5), Bonnie Muirhead (Season 3) and Virginia Dalbeck (Season 2). The runner-up team had a virtually flawless service from start to finish, with Ramsay commenting how fast food was leaving the kitchen. Jay sent up a peppery sea bass, but Kevin helped him get service back on track, while Paula called out Russell for calling Bonnie "sweetheart". For the black team, Robyn underdressed the Caesar salads, and she and Clemenza cooked appetizers not on order. Dana failed to ask for help and control the fish station, and when she let Clemenza help her on scallops, he overcooked them. Robyn seasoned raw scallops (which would cause them to dry out while cooking) and got kicked out for talking back to Ramsay. Ramsay told the black team their service was "not bad", but the runners-up were deemed to have been far better, meaning one member of the black team would be eliminated. Elimination: Robyn and Clemenza were nominated. Much to all the other chef's relief, Ramsay eliminated Robyn for her inconsistency, argumentative nature and lack of teamwork, but praised her for her passion, before telling Clemenza that he did not see him going to Vegas as head chef. Robyn's comment: "I thought that I was gonna be the Season 10 winner of Hell's Kitchen. I'm probably one of the only people in this competition that's won so many challenges. I definitely have some memorable experiences here and some experiences I like to forget. Coming here, I didn't realize it was gonna be this catty. There was 18 of us, I made it to the final six. I'm a winner, no matter what, in my book. And now, leaving here is gonna push me even harder and harder to succeed and show all those motherfuckers that are still here, go fuck yourself, because I'm better than you." Ramsay's comment: "Making it to the black jackets was a dream come true for Robyn. But cooking against the runners-up was a reality check for her and for me."
141	17	"5 Chefs Compete"	August 20, 2012	6.23
Challenge: The chefs had to teach five Miss Teen USA winners, Kamie Crawford (Justin), Stevi Perry (Clemenza), Hilary Cruz (Barbie), Katie Blair (Christina) and Allie LaForce (Dana), how to cook a chicken parmesan dish. Barbie and Hilary won, with Dana and Allie coming a close second. Reward/punishment: Barbie chose Justin to join her for a gourmet Italian lunch at Ado Ristorante and kayaking in the Venice canals. The others prepped pasta for the Italian-themed service. Service: Before service, Sous Chef Scott caught Clemenza overtenderizing chicken. Barbie incorrectly cooked risotto numerous times, to a point where Ramsay threatened to throw her out if she messed up again, and sent capellini with too little crab on the last ticket. Dana earned a trip to the storeroom after burning filets and Clemenza, despite producing perfect flatbreads, had a messy workspace and forgot the order multiple times. Christina burned and under-seasoned garnish, but recovered. Ramsay expressed disappointment with the performance and had the team nominate one for elimination. Elimination: The team could not choose between Barbie and Clemenza, so Ramsay nominated both of them. (Note: Clemenza's nomination count ties with Autumn Lewis of season 7 Sabrina Brimhall of season 8, Elise Wims in Season 9 and Scott Commings of Season 12 as the most-nominated chef, at seven nominations.) Ramsay eliminated Clemenza for his inconsistency and lack of organization, but commended him on his effort; Ramsay provided no comment on Clemenza's elimination and he did not receive a coat hook and burning picture scene. The final four found a champagne bottle from Ramsay, which included a congratulations note and a promised surprise the following night. Clemenza's comment: "Hell's Kitchen, without a doubt, is the hardest thing I ever had to do. It's been up and down, and high and low. But I fought through it. I've been up for elimination more than anybody. People thought I was down, people thought I was out, and I just kept coming and coming and coming back. To get kicked out on Italian night is embarrassing, but coming to Hell's Kitchen has definitely put some spark back into me. I know I'm going to the top."
142	18	"4 Chefs Compete"	August 27, 2012	6.87
The chefs were treated to a visit from their loved-ones: Christina's mother and girlfriend; Dana's parents; Barbie's husband, son, and daughter; and Justin's parents. Challenge: The chefs went to Bristol Farms, where they were given 10 minutes to spend $15 on ingredients before having 30 minutes to cook their dish. Chef David Lefevre, Patina manager Christian Philippo, and Bon Appétit magazine editor Hugh Garvey priced the dishes, with the chef with the highest average price winning. Dana won with her panko-coated halibut ($34), narrowly beating out Christina's grilled swordfish with saffron rice and shrimp ($33.67), while Barbie finished third ($33) and Justin last ($28.33). Reward/punishment: Dana visited Lefevre's restaurant Manhattan Beach Post, where he helped her cook and serve mussels to her parents. The others had to separate recyclable material from the trash and prep the kitchen for service. Service: Paris Las Vegas president David Hoenemeyer was a guest for this service. The chefs took turns running the pass while having to spot acts of sabotage Ramsay and sous chefs Scott and Andi set up. Justin had a very strong start, spotting crab instead of lobster in a spaghetti, and only had trouble with Dana's poor attitude on fish due to the latter not respecting Justin as a leader until she was berated by Ramsay. Dana was strong in leadership, but failed to notice that a risotto was seasoned with sugar instead of salt. Barbie kept addressing her orders to the diners instead of the chefs, but managed to catch mashed celeriac instead of mashed potatoes. Christina had a rough start when Dana kept getting her times wrong, but became more vocal and decisive, catching arugula instead of spinach. Elimination: Ramsay announced that two chefs would advance to the final. After each chef gave a reason to stay, Ramsay first eliminated Barbie, but praised her for her improvement, passion and hard work. The episode then ended in a "To Be Continued" cliffhanger as Ramsay prepared to name the two chefs advancing to the final. Barbie's comment: "I really did want to win, but, you know, Hell's Kitchen is not easy. At the very beginning, everyone was trying to get rid of me. But I didn't let that stop me. It wasn't easy, but I got a black jacket and got all the way to the top four. So I definitely feel like I proved some people wrong. I'm really proud of myself. I'm not gonna be bummed about it at all. I had a blast while I was here."
143	19	"2 Chefs Compete"	September 4, 2012	6.17
Elimination - continued: Ramsay chose Christina and Justin to advance to the final, eliminating Dana, but Ramsay praised Dana for being a strong competitor and her solid performance, while allowing her to keep her jacket. Dana's comment: "Hell's Kitchen has been so much harder than I ever thought it was gonna be. But I have to say that I think I did pretty well. I have Michelin-starred chefs, who have tasted my dishes and told me how amazing they are. Now I can leave here and say I got to serve David Beckham. These are all moments that are priceless, and I'm just gonna take these away, and even though I'm leaving Hell's Kitchen, I'm leaving with my head held high, and I know one thing, and that's I'll never stop cooking." Christina and Justin prepared a menu of four appetizers, four entrées and three desserts before Ramsay sent them on a private jet to Las Vegas, where they meet sous chefs Scott and Andi poolside at the Paris Las Vegas. They spent a day at the pool and had dinner with their loved ones. Later, they saw Penn & Teller perform, which featured Ramsay as part of a magic trick. Challenge: Christina and Justin then had each one hour to cook two appetizers and three entrées, judged by five well-renowned chefs, including Wolfgang Puck. Despite Justin scoring for both appetizer dishes, Christina scored on all three entrées and won 3–2. Reward: Christina was granted first pick in drafting a team using the eight chefs eliminated from the competition prior to the final. (Note: Tiffany did not return, so Patrick took her place as the last person eliminated prior to the top ten.) Christina picked Dana, Patrick, Kimmie and Robyn, while Justin chose Barbie, Brian and Royce, and was left with Clemenza. Pre-service: Christina and Justin briefed their team on their menus, but Clemenza, upset over being picked last, stood up. The episode then ended in a "To Be Continued" cliffhanger.
144	20	"Winner Chosen"	September 10, 2012	6.27
Pre-service - continued: Despite Clemenza being less than enthused over being picked last, he decided to take part. Christina and Justin held one final briefing the following morning, but Clemenza did not show up, causing Justin to encourage him. Ramsay gave each of the menu items a taste test, identifying dishes in need of tweaking, before starting Hell's Kitchen's 140th service. Service: Both teams encountered problems. Clemenza burned the bruschetta during prep and undercooked salmon, while Royce served raw crab cakes, needing Brian's help, and had a cod returned from the dining room for being undercooked. Barbie overcooked ribeye steak repeatedly, eventually running out on the final ticket. After conferring, Justin served filet mignon as a substitute. On Christina's team, Robyn, Kimmie, and Patrick performed strongly on appetizers, meat, and garnish respectively, despite Christina's distrust of the former. However, Dana burned scallops, which forced Robyn to refire a risotto. On entrees, Dana overcooked halibut, and Christina nearly kicked her out for arguing that they were OK and attempting to serve them. Luckily, Dana managed to bring up properly cooked halibut and get the table out. On the last ticket, Dana undercooked a pork chop, so Ramsay asked Christina to either serve the table incomplete or restart it. She decided to restart, which Ramsay agreed with. Both teams completed service. Before he sent the finalists to the dorms, Ramsay named Tavon the winner of Hell's Kitchen as a joke. Winner: After deliberating, Ramsay called Christina and Justin to his office and sent them to two doors; Christina's door opened, making her the tenth winner of Hell's Kitchen. Christina hung her portrait on the Wall of Fame and Justin took his defeat graciously. Justin's comment: "The toughest thing I ever had in my life, honestly, was holding that doorknob and not having it open. But I know I gave everything I could possibly give. I have no regrets. Man, this is the most amazing experience of my life, even though I didn't win. I don't want to lose to anybody, but obviously, Christina is very competitive. She's focused, and she's a great chef. You know, to be honest with you, if I lost to anybody else besides Christina, I would've probably walked out of here. But, man, it would've been great to open that door." Christina's comment: "Yeah! Oh, my God! It feels so good. It's totally amazing. I can barely feel my body right now. It's so completely overwhelming. I'm trying to hold onto every second of it here. I'm incredibly proud of myself and just thankful that I have left my mark here. I'm excited to go out to Vegas and keep pushing that bar higher and higher until I fucking touch the stars." Ramsay's comment: "Christina's passion and talent are undeniable. She's a strong leader who is totally at home in the kitchen. I know I'm not rolling the dice with her in Vegas, because she is the real deal."
