= Hell's Kitchen (American TV series) season 2 =

Hell's Kitchen
- Season 2
- Region 1 DVD cover
- Hosted by: Gordon Ramsay
- No. of contestants: 12
- Winner: Heather West
- Runner-up: Virginia Dalbeck
- No. of episodes: 11

Release
- Original network: Fox
- Original release: June 12 – August 14, 2006

Season chronology
- ← Previous; Season 1 Next → Season 3

The second season of the American competitive reality television series Hell's Kitchen premiered on Fox on June 12, 2006, and concluded on August 14, 2006. Gordon Ramsay returned as host and head chef, while Scott Leibfried returned as the Blue Team's sous-chef and Mary-Ann Salcedo returned as the Red Team's sous-chef. Jean-Philippe Susilovic returned as maître d'.

The season was won by sous-chef Heather West, with salad chef Virginia Dalbeck finishing second.

== Contestants ==
Twelve chefs competed in season two.

| Contestant | Age (at time of filming) | Occupation | Hometown | Result |
|---|---|---|---|---|
| Heather West | 25 | Sous chef | Port Jefferson, New York | Winner |
| Virginia Dalbeck | 25 | Salad chef | New York, New York | Runner-up |
| Keith Greene | 28 | Chef/bartender | Southampton, New York | Eliminated before finals |
| Sara Horowitz | 31 | Deli manager | Dallas, Texas | Eliminated after eighth service |
| Garrett Telle | 27 | Former Prisoner/Chef | Cedar Park, Texas | Eliminated after seventh service |
| Maribel Miller | 31 | Cafeteria chef | Brooklyn, New York | Eliminated after sixth service |
| Rachel Brown | 39 | Personal chef | Dallas, Texas | Eliminated after fifth service |
| Tom Pauley | 43 | Former stockbroker | Belleville, New Jersey | Eliminated after fourth service |
| Giacomo Alfieri | 21 | Pizza chef | Euless, Texas | Eliminated after third service |
| Gabe Gagliardi | 27 | Marketing executive | Chicago, Illinois | Eliminated after second service |
| Larry Sik | 38 | Fishmonger | Arlington, Texas | Hospitalized before second service |
| Paula "Polly" Holladay | 43 | Mother of Six | Ben Franklin, Texas | Eliminated after first service |

== Contestant progress ==
Each week, the best member from the losing team during the latest service period ("best" as determined by Ramsay) was asked to nominate two of their teammates for elimination; one of these two was sent home by Ramsay.

| No. | Chef | Original teams | | | Switched teams | | | Individuals | | | Finals |
| No. | Chef | 201 | 202 | 203 | 204 | 205 | 206 | 207 | 208 | 209 | 210/211 |
|---|---|---|---|---|---|---|---|---|---|---|---|
| 1 | Heather | BoW | WIN | WIN | LOSE | WIN | WIN | IN | BoB | IN | WINNER |
| 2 | Virginia | NOM | WIN | WIN | NOM | BoW | NOM | NOM | NOM | NOM | RUNNER-UP |
| 3 | Keith | WIN | LOSE | LOSE | BoW | WIN | WIN | BoW | IN | OUT | Virginia's team |
| 4 | Sara | LOSE | WIN | BoB | BoW | LOSE | NOM | IN | OUT | | Heather's team |
| 5 | Garrett | WIN | BoW | LOSE | LOSE | WIN | WIN | OUT | | | Heather's team |
| 6 | Maribel | LOSE | WIN | WIN | LOSE | NOM | OUT | | | | |
| 7 | Rachel | LOSE | WIN | WIN | LOSE | OUT | | | | | Heather's team |
| 8 | Tom | WIN | NOM | NOM | OUT | | | | | | Virginia's team |
| 9 | Giacomo | WIN | NOM | OUT | | | | | | | Virginia's team |
| 10 | Gabe | WIN | OUT | | | | | | | | |
| 11 | Larry | WIN | HOSP | | | | | | | | |
| 12 | Polly | OUT | | | | | | | | | |

- *Maribel was supposed to join but couldn't, so Giacomo replaced her.

Keywords

- WIN = Won the dinner service
- LOSE = Lost the dinner service
- BoB = Best of the Best, usually exempt from nomination
- BoW = Best of the Worst, sometimes exempt from nomination
- IN = not nominated for elimination
- NOM = nominated for elimination
- OUT = eliminated normally
- LEFT = withdrew from competition
- HOSP = eliminated due to hospitalization
- EJEC = eliminated during service

Color key
Chef was eliminated after regular nomination
Chef was eliminated after Ramsay's nomination
Chef was eliminated without nomination
Chef was eliminated from winning team
Chef was eliminated in the Cook For Your Life challenge
Chef was nominated to participate in the Cook For Your Life challenge
Chef was eliminated during service
Chef withdrew from the competition
Chef was the Best of the Best/Worst
Chef was retained after regular nomination
Chef was retained after Ramsay's nomination
Chef's nomination was voided
The winner of Hell's Kitchen
The runner-up of Hell's Kitchen

== Episodes ==
| No. overall | No. in season | Title | Original release date | U.S. viewers (millions) |
|---|---|---|---|---|
| 12 | 1 | "12 Chefs" | June 12, 2006 | 5.89 |
Signature dishes: The chefs each had 45 minutes to prepare their signature dish. Giacomo's frutti di mare was "not bad", and Heather's chocolate raspberry empanadas were deemed "the best thing" Ramsay had "tasted so far", even though the pastry was thick; the other dishes were poorly received; Rachel's butterfly shrimp were cooked nicely, but overpowered by the chocolate sauce, the sauce for Keith's sesame-crusted tuna was far too hot, and Ramsay refused to eat Polly's "undone" focaccia bread. Larry's Asian potato crab cakes were raw, and Maribel's Argentine plantain soup was overly spicy, garlicky and compared to "baby vomit". Ramsay spat out Tom's shrimp scampi, which was served with cooked Caesar salad, Garrett's meat was dry and overcooked, and Gabe's fish was raw. Sara's peekytoe crab pasta was overcooked and mushy, and Virginia's coconut and pomegranate celery root salad was described as "rabbit food" because it was completely raw, aside from the toasted nuts. After the challenge, Ramsay revealed that this season's winner would become the executive chef at the brand-new restaurant, which would eventually be revealed to be located at Red Rock Resort Spa and Casino in Las Vegas. For the first time, the chefs were divided by gender, with the men on the Blue Team and the women on the Red. Ramsay asked for two volunteer, which were Heather and Giacomo. They were chosen as the team's "donkeys"; they could only help their teammates or clean and organize the kitchen. In preparation, the women finished hours ahead of the men, though the men's progress was hindered by Tom sweating into the food, forcing them to restart. Service: In the women's kitchen, Polly failed to make risotto three times, not helped by Sara giving incorrect cooking times when she jumped onto her station to help her. Ramsay asked Polly to replace Heather as the donkey. Sara cheered when Heather's risotto was finally accepted, earning a scolding from Ramsay as it had taken them an hour and a half to serve a single appetizer. Virginia struggled on meat, and the team had mistakenly prepared veal stock rather than lamb stock, leading to Virginia asking the men for help, which they refused. When one customer complained to Ramsay that there was no pumpkin in his risotto and Ramsay did not immediately respond to him, he became aggressive, and Ramsay asked to escort him from the premises. In the men's kitchen, Tom caused a fire on the appetizer station, then forgot to turn his stove back on. Larry was berated for standing around and doing nothing, and Gabe undercooked wellingtons. After three hours, customers had a lot of wine, but very little food. When customers began shouting "We want our food!", Ramsay shut down the kitchens. Ramsay named the men winners for at least serving entrees; Heather was named best of the worst for being the only one on her team to send any food out. Elimination: Heather considered nominating Maribel, but changed her mind and nominated Polly and Virginia. Ramsay eliminated Polly for her lack of passion and poor performance on appetizers. Polly's comment: "I think my family will be surprised because they fully expected me to come here and kick some butt. I would rather be nice and lose than to be somebody who's conniving and win." Ramsay's comment: "This is a journey and right now, we're going to hell and back each and every week to make sure we find the right person. And Polly? No chance."
| 13 | 2 | "11 Chefs" | June 12, 2006 | 7.54 |
Group punishment: The teams were forced to dig into the trash bin containing the food that was wasted in the previous dinner service. Team challenge: The teams were challenged to cut the most steaks to exactly ten ounces; as the men had an extra member, Keith was forced to sit out. Sara and Rachel both scored three, while Heather, Virginia and Maribel each scored two. Gabe scored three, Garrett scored one, Giacomo scored two, but Larry scored zero. Lastly, Tom scored five and was praised, but the women still won 12-11. Reward/punishment: The women were rewarded with a helicopter trip and lunch at The Saddle Peak Lodge in the Santa Monica Mountains with Ramsay. The men prepped the steaks for the next dinner service. Larry's exit: The night after the challenge, Larry had trouble breathing and was rushed to hospital. The following morning, he called the remaining chefs from hospital and told them that he would not be returning due to health problems. Despite his departure, Tom remained unsympathetic, saying that Larry had spent the previous night in the hot tub. Rachel criticized Tom for this response and stated in a confessional that even if Larry partied in the hot tub the previous night, it wouldn't guarantee he would be feeling well later on. Ramsay gave no comment on Larry's departure. His photo was shown to be burned, but he did not receive the coat hanging scene. Larry's comment: "I didn't quit. My body quit. This is the worst thing that could've happened. And right now I'm a little broken, and it's hard for me to see my dream slip away." Service: Keith and Sara were chosen as servers for service, but Keith took a long time getting orders in before spending ten minutes rewriting a ticket. Heather burned her hand and had to leave service, but delegated her station to her team before leaving, later earning Ramsay's praise; with the women's kitchen missing Heather, Sara asked to join the kitchen and cook, which Ramsay agreed to. Virginia put incorrect sauce on monkfish and shocked Ramsay when she said she would serve a tortellini that was split. The men failed to serve an appetizer as Gabe allowed his teammates to work his station, while Tom and Giacomo struggled to work together on meat and garnish as Giacomo did not know what sides were required. After several customers walked out, Ramsay closed the kitchens. Ramsay named the women winners for their improvement; Garrett was named best of the worst for being the only one not to struggle. Elimination: Garrett nominated Giacomo and Tom. After Tom pled his case, Ramsay sent him back in line and nominated Gabe. Ramsay eliminated Gabe for being too nice and allowing his teammates to work his station. Gabe's comment: "Chef said I was too much of a sweet guy, but you don't have to be loud, and rude, and obnoxious to run a kitchen. I definitely don't think Chef Ramsay made the right decision." Ramsay's comment: "It's absolutely crucial in Hell's Kitchen to have finesse and passion. It was pretty obvious that Gabe had no passion."
| 14 | 3 | "9 Chefs" | June 19, 2006 | 7.50 |
Team challenge: Both teams had to cook three entrees (chicken, tortellini and salmon) in twenty minutes, with one person in the kitchen at a time. During the switch, each team member would only have fifteen seconds to give information to their replacements. The women had an extra member, so Heather sat out, fearing her hand injury would slow her team down, though Sara assumed she was putting herself in a less vulnerable position. Maribel did not hear the tortellini entree from Rachel, leading herself and then Sara to carry on cooking the other two dishes. Meanwhile, Tom was disallowed from using tortellini he found from a prior service, leading the men to get confused - Giacomo, Keith and Garrett all made fresh tortellini. The women only created two entrees and the men scored on tortellini by default, but the women won by scoring on chicken and salmon as the men had forgot the sauce. Reward/punishment: The women were rewarded with a yacht trip with Ramsay. The men were forced to do both teams' laundry by hand. When they returned, Garrett made a comment Heather considered to be sexist and later argued with Heather, creating a bitter rivalry. Service: Sara and Keith both performed strongly on appetizers, though Keith was scolded for handling rice with his hands and for not pulling up his trousers, which the diners saw. Garrett was berated twice for whistling. Keith asked Tom to make a batch of tomato sauce, only for Keith to then say he didn't need it, prompting Tom to accuse Keith of throwing him under the bus. Giacomo forgot to turn the oven on and lied about having a duck ready, so Ramsay switched all the stations around. Tom was scolded for giving up after burning his hand, and ran out of mashed potatoes, making it impossible for service to get back on track. In the women's kitchen, Heather was scolded for trying to take over Sara's station, while Maribel undercooked lamb Wellingtons several times, resulting in one table threatening to walk out after having waited for over an hour. Maribel served undercooked wellingtons before correcting the mistake, by which point the diners had already left. Ramsay shut the kitchens down at this point, but named the women winners for serving more entrees, singling out Sara as the best of the night. Elimination: While Keith was acknowledged as the best of the worst, Ramsay refused to let him select two nominees for elimination due to his failure to step up as a leader. Instead, the men individually nominated each other for elimination. Everyone else nominated Tom for his continued struggle, but Tom nominated Giacomo, whom Ramsay eliminated for being the worst performer of the night. Giacomo's comment: "I was shocked because I'm not a quitter, and Tom just gives up. I screwed up one big thing tonight. I wish I could go back in time, and fix that, but you've gotta pay the piper." Ramsay's comment: "Before you can even attempt to run a restaurant, the first thing you've gotta do is make sure you know how to cook. Giacomo, he was lost beyond belief."
| 15 | 4 | "8 Chefs" | June 26, 2006 | 7.97 |
Team change: Before the challenge, Ramsay acknowledged that the men was now two members short, and Rachel, Sara and Heather had stepped up as leaders. He then transferred a reluctant Heather to the men's team. Field trip: The teams were taken to Pink's Hot Dogs, where Ramsay surprised them with news that they would be opening for lunch for the first time, forcing them to run back to Hell's Kitchen. Team challenge: The teams had to cook lunch for a group of children. Despite her reluctance to being on the blue team, Heather clamped down on bickering between Garrett and Tom and helped the blue team finally come together. Meanwhile, the red team was marred by a power struggle between Rachel and Sara, resulting in the quality of the food leaving the kitchen being occasionally inconsistent. Both teams managed to complete a service for the first time, finally impressing Ramsay. The red team earned a score of 9.84 out of 10, but the blue team won with a score of 9.85. Reward/punishment: The blue team won a trip to Pacific Park. The red team cleaned up the dining room, full of food on the floor, balloons and silly string. Garrett and Heather made up and became friends, along with Keith. They all secretly plotted to get Tom out of the team, because he was holding them back. Service: In the red kitchen, Rachel struggled on risotto, and Sara sabotaged Virginia by saying she was "ready and waiting for her call", though later told Ramsay she had yet to put on her turbot. When Virginia tried to explain the situation, Ramsay accused Virginia of lying to him and of not being a team player. Maribel served poor mashed potatoes, Rachel and Virginia left bones and wing on a quail, and Rachel left to buy ice after running out (part of their earlier punishment), forgetting to bring money on the way. Meanwhile, despite Keith and Heather having a strong performance on the blue team, Garrett served a bland risotto and had a cold lobster spaghetti returned. Tom was scolded for working the wrong order and burning a duck, almost setting fire to the restaurant. Ramsay kicked Tom off the meat station for Keith. Virginia served rare wellington instead of medium, and when Ramsay realized the women were glazing with egg whites instead of egg wash and had run out of wellingtons, he closed both kitchens. Ramsay then declared both teams losers, ordering one nominee from each team for elimination before sending them back to the dorms. This was the first time in the show's history that both teams lost a dinner service, something that would become more frequent in later seasons. This was also the first time any team got kicked out. Keith and Sara were named the best of their respective teams. Elimination: Keith nominated Tom and Sara nominated Virginia. Ramsay also called out Rachel for having her worst service yet, so Rachel volunteered to nominate herself in place of Virginia. However, Ramsay eliminated Tom for his consistently poor performances. Tom's comment: "I love working in the kitchen. By no means have I given up. This is the path I've chosen. You know what's scary? I gotta go find a job. Hey, Chef, I need a recommendation." Ramsay's comment: "Tom's got a big heart. Sadly, he's a really crap cook. Why on earth he's ever decided to attempt to become a chef? I'll never know."
| 16 | 5 | "7 Chefs" | July 10, 2006 | 6.42 |
Team challenge: The teams were told to taste various high cuisine dishes, not realizing they were made of low quality processed foods. Afterwards, they were challenged to a blind taste test; Rachel was forced to sit out. Keith and Maribel both scored two, Virginia scored three compared to Heather's two, and Sara and Garrett both scored two, giving the red team a 7-6 win. Reward/punishment: The red team did a photo shoot with Ramsay for TV Guide. The blue team cleaned the kitchen and Garrett begrudgingly served champagne to the red team. Service: In the blue kitchen, Heather was rebuked for cooking spaghetti ahead of order. Afterwards, she served an undercooked risotto, but the kitchen managed to get through appetizers under Keith's leadership. However, Heather tried to take over meat from Garrett, causing Garrett to send up the wrong number of quail and drag on lamb sauce, eventually forcing Keith to step in and take control. However, Keith argued with Ramsay when one of his dishes was returned from the dining room for being cold. Despite this, the blue team completed service. Meanwhile, when Maribel's foie gras was returned for having hair in it, she argued it wasn't her hair, and Rachel burned duck and overcooked quail. Virginia succeeded on fish, earning Ramsay's praise. After Rachel overcooked wellingtons and then tried to cover them with sauce to make them look medium, Ramsay shut down the kitchens, declared the blue team the winners for serving more entrees, and named Virginia the best of the worst for her improvement. Elimination: Virginia struggled with nominations before picking Rachel and Maribel, though gave a lengthy speech as to why Sara could also be nominated. Ramsay eliminated Rachel for her many mistakes, but praised her effort. During Rachel's exit, a retrospect montage was played. Heather was particularly upset with Rachel's exit, as they had grown close, especially in their mutual dislike of Sara. Rachel had told Heather that if she were to go home, she'd like Heather to win. Rachel's comment: "I've never, ever failed at anything I've set my mind to. It hurts, but everything has changed since I've been in Hell's Kitchen. You know, the restaurant was gonna be... Yeah, it's a dream. You don’t quit having a dream because one night." Ramsay's comment: "Rachel clearly couldn't handle it. She buckled, panicked, and actually screwed the kitchen completely. You've got no chance of running a successful business if you can't handle one section."
| 17 | 6 | "6 Chefs" | July 17, 2006 | 7.19 |
Team challenge: Both teams, after going to the Grand Central Market to buy ingredients, had to create a three-course meal. On appetizers, Ramsay was bothered by a sharp shrimp tail in Garrett's roasted corn scallop and shrimp bisque and felt Sara's bell pepper soup was too burnt, due to Virginia's idea to roast the peppers. For the entree, Ramsay was pleased with both Virginia's chicken roulade stuffed with Mexican heart salamis, sliced tomatoes and garlic, and Keith's bone in pan roasted ribeye with a tomato and smoked chili demi, despite the latter's poor presentation. For desserts, Ramsay found Heather's fresh fruit crepes with a mango peach puree very soggy, while Maribel's strawberry shortcake was tasty, if uninspired. Ramsay, having only been impressed by the entrees, gave the red team the win, picking Virginia's dish as the best of the day and using it as a tie-breaker. Reward/punishment: The red team had a three-course dinner with Ramsay, with each course at a different L.A. restaurant. The blue team were tasked to help with the restaurant's delivery service, though were angry, as they felt they should have won. When the red team set off, Garrett angrily flipped them off, unaware that Ramsay was inside it. Ramsay scolded him the next morning. Service: Ramsay allowed both teams to create their own menu. Virginia and Sara (shutting out Maribel) came up with exotic ideas for the red team such as tuna sashimi and rack of lamb. For the blue team, Keith and Heather came up with the ideas for their menu but shot down Garrett's for being too complex. As a result, Garrett maintained a negative attitude throughout prep. In the blue kitchen, Keith performed well on appetizers, though Garrett undercooked duck twice, so had to be assisted by Ramsay and then Heather, after which acceptable servings were served. Both Heather and Keith performed well, and despite being forced out of service to take in additional deliveries, they still managed to complete service, for the first time in Hell's Kitchen history. In the red kitchen, Virginia undercooked scallops and struggled to slice the sashimi. Maribel had a salmon returned and refused to help Sara and Virginia after they would not let her contribute to the menu, and Sara did not manage a single acceptable serving of lamb, which led Ramsay to order it off the menu. The red team barely managed to send out a few appetizers, but when Ramsay suggested their salmon dish just be cut into a slice, Sara argued with him, causing Ramsay to scold her. The blue team were ordered to help the red team, while Ramsay left the kitchen in disgust. Ramsay named the blue team clear winners and praised Keith for having his strongest performance, and told Garrett he was lucky to be on the blue team. Elimination: Ramsay called down the entire red team for nomination. Despite holding Sara primarily responsible for the red team's failure and calling it her worst performance thus far, Ramsay eliminated Maribel for her lack of leadership, but praised her attitude. Maribel's comment: "You know, Sara and Virginia are just out for themselves. I'm here trying to work as a team. I think that was my weakness. I was myself throughout the process, my husband will see that, and he'll be proud of me, and my daughter will, too, and that's all that counts to me." Ramsay's comment: "I'm trying to find someone that deserves a restaurant. Now, to run that restaurant properly, you need a leader and Maribel clearly can't lead a section, let alone a kitchen."
| 18 | 7 | "5 Chefs" | July 24, 2006 | 7.45 |
Challenge: Ramsay merged the final five into one team and awarded them all black jackets. Each chef was given twenty minutes to cook a special dish for Ramsay. Sara's dish was deemed the worst due to poor presentation, while Garrett and Heather made good tasting dishes, but were ruled out due to over-seasoned prawns and unwashed spinach respectively. Ramsay selected Keith as the winner, with Virginia a close runner-up. Reward/punishment: Keith received a trip to Las Vegas to visit the Red Rock Resort Spa and Casino and chose Virginia to go with him. In addition, his veal chop was placed on the menu for service. The others fumigated the kitchen, greatly frustrating Garrett, as Keith had promised that if either were to win a challenge, they would take the other. Service: For the first time, the chefs served the entire restaurant. Sara and Heather got off to a slow start on appetizers, with Heather underseasoning a risotto and Sara forgetting to cook scallops in a non-stick pan. Heather rebounded, though Sara still struggled with portion sizes on scallops. Despite struggles in communication, Sara and Heather still managed to serve appetizers at a reasonable pace. Garrett served raw chicken and was kicked off the meat station for Keith, only to send mangled salmon. Virginia struggled on garnish, breaking romaine hearts and arguing with Ramsay about cooking tortellini when it wasn't even on the menu. Despite setbacks, Keith's strong performance ensured that entrees were served at a reasonable pace. However, one customer questioned Ramsay about how long her meal would take, and when Ramsay asked her to be patient before insulting her, she flipped over the tray for an entire table, setting back the kitchen and causing her to be escorted. A 12 top bachelorette party arrived, which the black jackets served without further incident. Service was completed with Keith named the clear best of the night, thus being the only chef to receive Best of the Best/Worst four times. Elimination: Keith immediately ruled out Heather, though struggled between Virginia and Sara. After much thought, he nominated Virginia and Garrett. Ramsay eliminated Garrett for serving raw chicken, which Ramsay deemed unacceptable. Garrett's comment: "Keith stabbed me in the back. But the fact of the matter is that the chicken went out there undercooked, and now I'm leaving. I'm still not gonna give up, but I wanted this more than anything." Ramsay's comment: "I'm trying to find someone here that deserves a restaurant. Each and every step of the way, Garrett fought me and his team. That's why he's not here any longer."
| 19 | 8 | "4 Chefs" | July 31, 2006 | 7.84 |
Challenge: The task was to serve a group of construction workers. Each construction worker sampled all four dishes and instructed to vote for the best and the worst entree. Virginia's turkey and feta sandwich was voted the best and Heather's chicken sandwich with french fries was voted the worst, upsetting her. Reward/punishment: Virginia was rewarded with immunity from elimination in the next service and a $1000 shopping spree at Sur La Table. The others had to remove meat from crabs. They secretly decided to eliminate Virginia as they believe she was the weakest chef, even though she kept winning challenges. She later earned their resentment by buying them what they considered as cheap gifts. Service: Three master chefs dined at Hell's Kitchen for service; Michael Mina, David Myers and Josie Le Balch. Keith did well on appetizers, but Virginia on garnish struggled to keep up with Heather on meat. The three master chefs then arrived, and each chef served a dish to them. Keith's lobster spaghetti received poor reviews for being undercooked. Sara also struggled to keep up with Heather and ran out of salmon, substituting with turbot. Ramsay threatened to switch Heather to the station as she was performing so well, though Sara defended her ground. Sara's scallops received mixed reviews from the master chefs, though Heather's wellingtons received praise. Virginia could not find the garnishes needed and Heather had to come to her rescue, though even then, Virginia's peas were burnt, which angered Ramsay. After Virginia also burned cabbage, Ramsay revoked her immunity. The chefs completed service; Ramsay named Heather best of the night. Elimination: Virginia stated her belief that she did not deserve to be in the competition, and under the belief that Virginia would "take herself out", Heather decided to nominate her and Sara, who nevertheless objected to her nomination. Virginia stated she only wanted to be in the competition on the basis of her cooking ability and not because of Ramsay's promise, though Ramsay offered to give Virginia back her immunity, which Virginia accepted, leading to Sara being eliminated for her lack of teamwork and disintegrating performances, angering Keith and Heather. Sara's comment: "I can't be angry at Virginia. It's been one hell of a trip. It's not about making friends, it's about winning that prize. I came here thinking that I had the potential to win the prize, and I’m worried that I'm just really not good enough to do great things." Ramsay's comment: "Sara's not good enough as a cook. She made so many simple mistakes, she definitely didn't merit her own restaurant. Adieu, sweetheart. Kiss my grits."
| 20 | 9 | "3 Chefs" | August 7, 2006 | 8.13 |
Challenge: The chefs were given twenty minutes to recreate Ramsay's signature dish on taste alone. Virginia won by correctly identifying every component, as Keith mistook Chilean sea bass for striped sea bass and Heather mistook mashed potatoes for white bean puree. Heather and Keith were disappointed with this, as they both believe she cheated by buying Ramsay's recipe book the previous week and as she asked for ingredients the others had just finished using. Reward/punishment: Ramsay gave Virginia tips on how to run a restaurant. Keith and Heather polished glasses and silverware. Service: Each chef took a turn running the hot pass. Sous-chefs Scott and Mary-Ann, assisting with the cooking, were secretly instructed by Ramsay to make a deliberate mistake. Virginia got the night off to a bad start when she burned two orders of salmon and casually put them in the bin, while Heather burned chicken. In Keith's turn at the pass, he spotted overcooked pasta, but he refused to dictate times, leading to Heather taking control a lot during his turn. Meanwhile, Virginia remained unresponsive to Keith's orders, forgot what she was cooking and got overwhelmed on the fish station, confusing the rest of the kitchen's timings. Heather led well at the pass, being vocal in giving out timings and controlling the kitchen. Keith sent up enough rice for one risotto instead of two and talked back to Ramsay, leading Heather to stabilize the situation. However, she failed to spot lumpy mashed potatoes. Virginia got off to a slow start on the pass, leaving Keith and Heather unable to remember her orders. However, she rebounded and impressed Ramsay with her leadership, spotting bass in a dish instead of salmon. Elimination: Ramsay asked the chefs to nominate one other person for elimination. Heather reconsidered her and Keith's pact to eliminate Virginia, due to Keith's weak pass performance. Heather and Keith nominated Virginia and Virginia nominated Keith. Ramsay eliminated Keith for his poor leadership and hostile attitude in service. After his elimination, Keith criticized Ramsay for his choice, accusing him of having a "hard-on" for Virginia. Ramsay however defended his choice, while arguing that Keith's attack on him just proved he made the right decision. He said his farewells to Heather, though ignored Virginia. Keith did not receive a coat hanging or burning picture sequence. Keith's comment: "I definitely deserve my own restaurant. The whole time I've been here I did nothing but kill it. He doesn't like my personality, so fuck him, because I cook better than all those bitches! He didn't like my personality, he didn't like K-Grease. I tried to hide him, but he fucking got out. So it's bullshit!" Ramsay's comment: "You got two choices: you run the team or the team runs you. And sadly, the team ran Keith. If Keith could only lose the attitude underneath all that, there's one talented, talented cook."
| 21 | 10 | "2 Chefs" | August 14, 2006 | 7.63 |
Heather's parents and Virginia's mother and husband came in for a surprise visit. The women were then given control of half of Hell's Kitchen each and instructed to remodel it for service, as well as create their own menus. Challenge: Heather and Virginia traveled to Green Valley Ranch Resort in Las Vegas to make a signature dish judged by 20 people. Virginia made a chicken roulade and Heather a sea bass dish. After a 10-10 tie, Ramsay brought in an extra person to sample both dishes, and Virginia won the tie-breaker. Reward: Virginia was granted first pick in drafting a team using the six chefs eliminated from the competition prior to the final. (Note: Maribel did not return, so Giacomo took her place as the last contestant eliminated prior to the final eight.) Virginia picked Keith, Tom and Giacomo, while Heather picked Rachel and Sara, and was left with Garrett. Though Heather's team were happy with her (even Garrett, who was picked last, and Sara, who had previously admitted her dislike of Heather), Virginia's were not; Virginia had openly stated she picked her team as she believed they were the weakest chefs, Keith openly stated he wanted Heather to win the previous week and Tom did not like working for a woman. Virginia promised to pay each the men $1000 to work for her.
| 22 | 11 | "Winner Announced" | August 14, 2006 | 9.54 |
Remodeling and preparation: Heather and Virginia remodeled the dining room per their wishes. Heather made the walls look like a blank canvas with a video wall and graffiti, including messages from her chefs. Ramsay liked most of her ideas, but suggested she remove the graffiti. After sampling her dishes, Ramsay found them to be good, but wanted them to be more exciting. Virginia created a waterfall behind the walls with an atmosphere akin to a desert sunset, and despite having trouble implementing the water wall, it was completed before service. Ramsay liked this. Service: Heather had a great service rate but struggled occasionally with quality control, while Virginia was proficient in quality control at the expense of service rate. Virginia spent a long time plating, refusing her team's help, which resulted in a back up of dishes and some dishes getting cold and thus being sent back. Keith and Tom showed Virginia little respect and Tom cut himself, leaving the kitchen late into service for over ten minutes seeing a medic, despite Ramsay not considering it to be a serious problem. Despite earning praise for refiring Giacomo's salty salad and raw snapper, Virginia's perfectionism left her without a replacement after a snapper was sent back from the dining room. For Heather's team, Sara sent salty salad and a cold goat cheese tart, Rachel undercooked steaks and the team became flustered by Heather's abrasive leadership. Despite this, Heather was considered a strong leader, and they picked up from their mistakes, finishing before Virginia's team despite Sara struggling to plate empanadas. Ramsay praised both teams for their services, but unbeknownst to them, the President of the Red Rock Resort was among the clients sampling dishes from each menu. Ramsay based his decision on comments from the President of the Red Rock resort, customer comment cards and his own observations. Winner: Heather and Virginia stood in front of a closed door; Heather's door opened, making her the second winner of Hell's Kitchen. Virginia was very gracious in defeat, stating that she hoped she would be as good as Heather in the future. Virginia's comment: "I feel totally happy for Heather. I trust Chef Ramsay's decision and, I know one day, I'll be as good as Heather." Heather's comment: "I'm so happy, I can not believe I won, it feels like a dream," I get to live my dream... my life has just changed drastically." Ramsay's comment: "Heather won Hell's Kitchen because of her determination. She stuck to what she knew best and she controlled her kitchen from start to finish. Heather clearly has great leadership qualities and this, for a 25-year old cook, is a phenomenon. This woman is going to be a big success. My work is done. It's been a phenomenal journey. I'm ready for the next challenge. And fuck you all."
