= Rock Harper =

American chef and restaurateur (born 1976)

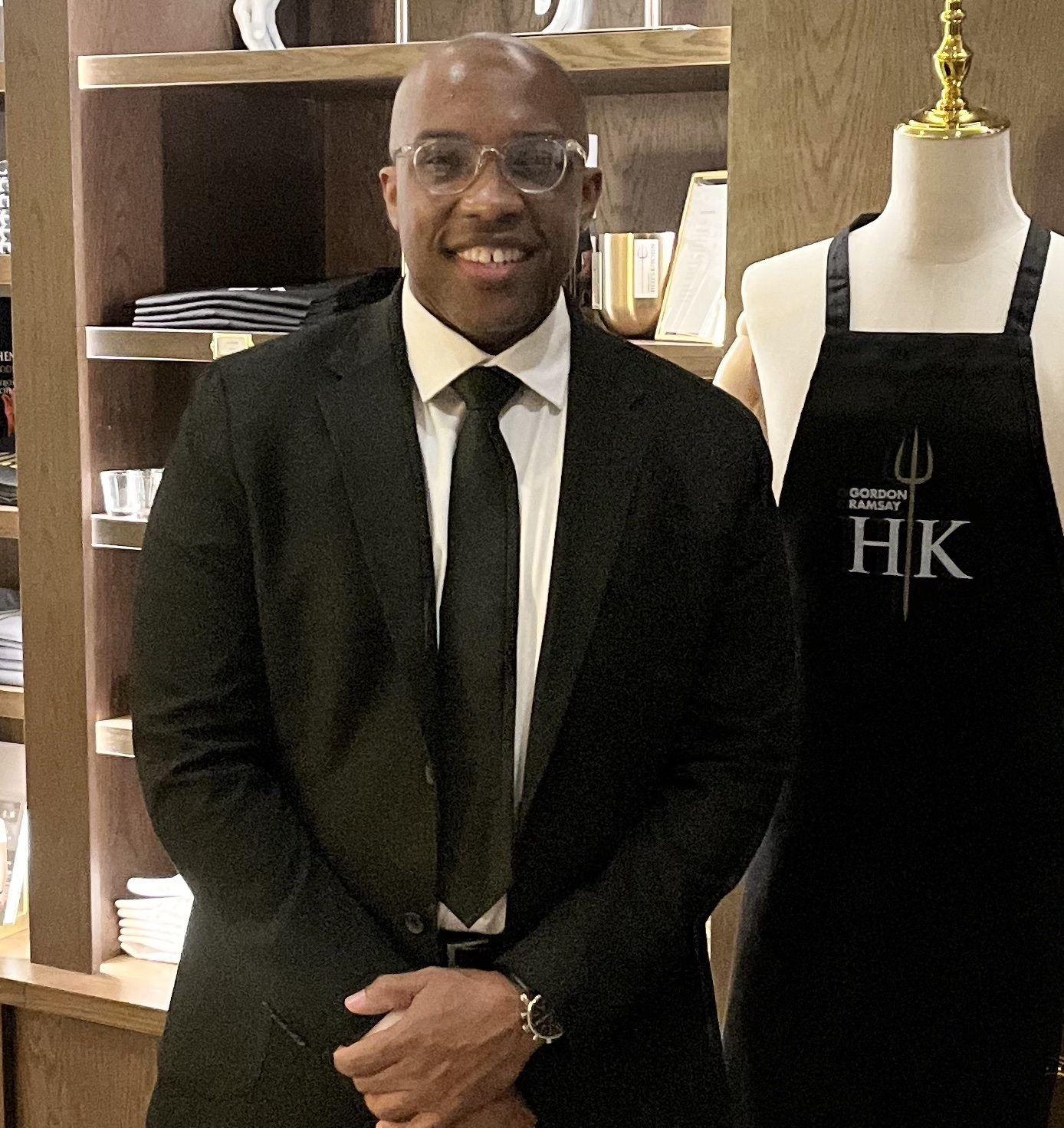
- Rock Harper at Hell's Kitchen DC Restaurant
- Born: Rahman Harper; December 17, 1976 (age 49); San Diego, California, U.S.
- Education: Johnson & Wales University
- Culinary career
- Cooking style: Soul Food
- Current restaurant(s): Queen Mother's Fried Chicken (Arlington, Virginia) (2020–present) Hill Prince Bar (Washington, DC) (2023–present) Hush Harbor (Washington, DC) (2025–present)
- Television show: Hell's Kitchen (U.S.)
- Award won: James Beard Award Nominee 2023
- Website: www.queenmothercooks.com

Rahman "Rock" Harper (born December 17, 1976) is an American chef, television personality and restaurateur who won in the third season of the Gordon Ramsay-presented reality television show Hell's Kitchen.

== Biography ==
Harper discovered his love of cooking in his early teens and earned a culinary degree at Johnson & Wales University (JWU).

Harper has held positions at Café Calliope, Burke Station Restaurant, Planet Hollywood, and BET on Jazz Restaurant, and was executive chef at B. Smith's Restaurant prior to joining in the third season of the Fox reality-television show Hell's Kitchen in 2007. After his win on Hell's Kitchen where he accepted the prize of a high-salaried stint as head chef at the Terre Verde Restaurant at Green Valley Ranch Resort, he became the National Celebrity Chef for the March of Dimes. After his year at Terra Verde he then worked as the executive chef of Ben's Next Door and The Carlyle Club.

Harper later became an instructor at Stratford University. In 2010, he published the book 44 Things Parents Should Know about Healthy Cooking for Kids.

In 2013, Harper appeared on Chef Wanted with Anne Burrell and won the executive chef position at The Precinct, a steakhouse in Cincinnati, Ohio; however, he did not ultimately accept the job.

In 2020, Harper opened Queen Mother’s Fried Chicken inside Ghostline in Washington, DC as a tribute to his mother, Carole Harper. One year later, the restaurant was relocated to The Kitchen of Purpose in Arlington, Virginia. The restaurant is known for duck-fat brined fried chicken that was featured on TV shows such as Hell's Kitchen and Sherri. In the early fall of 2023, Queen Mother's opened a new location at the National Landing Water Park in Arlington, Virginia.

In 2023, Harper became the owner of Hill Prince Bar, a neighborhood bar and event venue located in the H Street Corridor in Northeast, Washington, D.C.

In September 2025, Harper opened Hush Harbor, a phone-free bar and restaurant in Alexandria where guests lock their phones in a provided pouch when arriving.

== Awards ==
In 2020 and 2021, Queen Mother’s was nominated as a RAMMY Award finalist presented by Restaurant Association of Metropolitan Washington (RAMW) in the category of “Hottest New Sandwich Shop.” The Annual RAMMY Awards honors the hard-working individuals and organizations and restaurants in Washington DC's foodservice community.

In 2023, Harper was a semifinalist for a James Beard Award in the category of “Best Chef – Mid Atlantic.” The James Beard Awards honors talent in the culinary and food media industries.

== Charity work ==
- March of Dimes - National Celebrity Chef
- DC Central Kitchen - Board Member
- DC Greens - Board of Directors
- Global Food and Drink Initiative: Board of Directors

== Filmography ==
=== Television ===
Year	Title	Network	Notes	Ref
2007-2025	Hell’s Kitchen	Fox	Entire season 3	
2007-2025	Hell’s Kitchen	Fox	Season 4 Episode 10	Hell's Kitchen (American season 4)
2007-2025	Hell’s Kitchen	Fox	Season 5 Episode 15	Hell's Kitchen (American season 5)
2007-2025	Hell’s Kitchen	Fox	Season 6 - Episode 15	Hell's Kitchen (American season 6)
2007-2025	Hell’s Kitchen	Fox	Season 8 - Episode 8	Hell's Kitchen (American season 8)
2007-2025	Hell’s Kitchen	Fox	Season 10 - Episode 1	Hell's Kitchen (American season 10)
2007-2025	Hell’s Kitchen	Fox	Season 11 - Episodes 17 & 18	Hell's Kitchen (American season 11)
2007-2025	Hell’s Kitchen	Fox	Season 12 - Episodes 15 & 16	Hell's Kitchen (American season 12)
2007-2025	Hell’s Kitchen	Fox	Season 13 - Episode 15	Hell's Kitchen (American season 13)
2007-2025	Hell’s Kitchen	Fox	Season 24 - Episode 9	Hell's Kitchen (American season 24)
2013	Chef Wanted with Anne Burrell	Food Network	Entire season	
2020	Gordon Ramsay's 24 Hours to Hell and Back	Fox	Season 3, Episode 5	
2025	Gordon Ramsay's Secret Service	Fox	Season 1 - Episodes 1-10	
