= Hell's Kitchen (American TV series) season 3 =

Hell's Kitchen
- Season 3
- Region 1 DVD cover
- Hosted by: Gordon Ramsay
- No. of contestants: 12
- Winner: Rahman "Rock" Harper
- Runner-up: Bonnie Muirhead
- No. of episodes: 11

Release
- Original network: Fox
- Original release: June 4 – August 13, 2007

Season chronology
- ← Previous; Season 2 Next → Season 4

The third season of the American competitive reality television series Hell's Kitchen premiered on Fox on June 4, 2007, and concluded on August 13, 2007. Gordon Ramsay returned as host and head chef, while Scott Leibfried returned as the Blue Team's sous-chef and Mary-Ann Salcedo returned for her final season as the Red Team's sous-chef. Jean-Philippe Susilovic returned as maître d'.

The season was won by executive chef Rahman "Rock" Harper, with nanny/personal chef Bonnie Muirhead finishing second. The season finale was a record high for the show's ratings, drawing 9.8 million viewers.

== Chefs ==
Twelve chefs competed in season three.

Contestant	Age (at time of filming)	Occupation	Hometown	Result
Rahman "Rock" Harper	30	Executive Chef	Spotsylvania Courthouse, Virginia	Winner
Bonnie Muirhead	26	Nanny/Personal Chef	Santa Monica, California	Runner-up
Jen Yemola	26	Pastry Chef	Hazleton, Pennsylvania	Eliminated before finals
Julia Williams	28	Waffle House Cook	Atlanta, Georgia	Eliminated after eighth service
Josh Wahler	26	Jr. Sous Chef	Miami Beach, Florida	Ejected during eighth service
Brad Miller	25	Sous Chef	Scottsdale, Arizona	Eliminated after seventh service
Melissa Firpo	29	Line Cook	New York, New York	Eliminated after sixth service
Vincent "Vinnie" Fama	29	Nightclub Chef	Milltown, New Jersey	Eliminated after fourth service
Joanna Dunn	22	Assistant Chef	Detroit, Michigan	Eliminated after third service
Aaron Song	48	Retirement Home Chef	Rancho Palos Verdes, California	Hospitalized before third service
Eddie Langley	28	Grill Cook	Atlanta, Georgia	Eliminated after second service
Tiffany Nagel	27	Kitchen Manager	Scottsdale, Arizona	Eliminated after first service

Viewers have identified that there was a 13th contestant named J.R. that appeared in the first episode, but not referenced nor appeared in the second half of the first episode or later in the season. His appearance was confirmed when the first episode was released in a widescreen format on YouTube in 2024, which showed him at the edges of the various lineups. The reasoning why J.R. was effectively removed from the show was unclear though may be related to off-show behavior towards other contestants post-filming.

== Contestant progress ==
Each week, the best member (as determined by Ramsay) from the losing team during the latest service period is asked to nominate two of their teammates for elimination; one of these two is sent home by Ramsay.

No.	Chef	Original teams					Switched teams		Individuals		Finals
No.	Chef	301	302	303	304	305	306	307	308	309	310/311
1	Rock	WIN	BoW	WIN	BoW	WIN	LOSE	LOSE	NOM	IN	WINNER
2	Bonnie	LOSE	WIN	LOSE	NOM	NOM	WIN	NOM	BoW	IN	RUNNER-UP
3	Jen	LOSE	WIN	NOM (Note: Jen nominated herself)	BoW	BoW	WIN	LOSE	IN	OUT	Bonnie's team
4	Julia	LOSE	WIN	NOM	LOSE	LOSE	WIN	BoW	OUT		Bonnie's team
5	Josh	WIN	NOM	WIN	NOM	WIN	NOM	LOSE	EJEC		Rock's team
6	Brad	WIN	LOSE	WIN	LOSE	WIN	NOM	OUT			Rock's team
7	Melissa	BoW	WIN	LOSE	NOM	NOM	OUT				Bonnie's team
8	Vinnie	WIN	LOSE	WIN	OUT						Rock's team
9	Joanna	NOM	WIN	OUT							
10	Aaron	WIN	LOSE	HOSP							
11	Eddie	WIN	OUT								
12	Tiffany	OUT									

Keywords

- WIN = Won the dinner service
- LOSE = Lost the dinner service
- BoB = Best of the Best, usually exempt from nomination
- BoW = Best of the Worst, sometimes exempt from nomination
- IN = not nominated for elimination
- NOM = nominated for elimination
- OUT = eliminated normally
- LEFT = withdrew from competition
- HOSP = eliminated due to hospitalization
- EJEC = eliminated during service

Color key
Chef was eliminated after regular nomination
Chef was eliminated after Ramsay's nomination
Chef was eliminated without nomination
Chef was eliminated from winning team
Chef was eliminated in the Cook For Your Life challenge
Chef was nominated to participate in the Cook For Your Life challenge
Chef was eliminated during service
Chef withdrew from the competition
Chef was the Best of the Best/Worst
Chef was retained after regular nomination
Chef was retained after Ramsay's nomination
Chef's nomination was voided
The winner of Hell's Kitchen
The runner-up of Hell's Kitchen

== Episodes ==
No. overall	No. in season	Title	Original release date	U.S. viewers (millions)
23	1	"12 Chefs Compete"	June 4, 2007	8.16
For this episode, Fox added a parental advisory notification to the TV14 rating. It opened with chef Ramsay seated at a table in the dining room, telling viewers he was going to be nicer this time around. After a few seconds, he admitted he was joking. The chefs arrived at Hell's Kitchen, and Jean-Philippe began to brief them until Ramsay interrupted, instructing them to prepare their signature dish. Signature dishes: The chefs each had 45 minutes to make their signature dish. Melissa's pepper-crusted steak with roasted asparagus and Tiffany's seafood tostada were both deemed delicious. Ramsay was disappointed by Julia's chicken-fried chicken penne, which was tasty but too peppery, and he liked Aaron's finger food platter but felt there were too many components on the plate. He refused to taste Rock's scallops and potato gnocchi because the gnocchi was frozen. Vinnie's chorizo-encrusted pink snapper was too spicy, which he argued with Ramsay over. Joanna's chicken parmesan-crusted chicken and spaghetti was dry and salty, and Ramsay refused to taste her raspberry Bellini. Josh's foie gras was raw and salty, and Ramsay could recognize Bonnie's inexperience from her cheese dish. Brad and Eddie scallop dishes were both poorly received; the former's had an overpowering vanilla sauce and the latter's was raw. Jen's vanilla crêpe was too thick and also reeked of alcohol due to an overuse of peach schnapps. After the challenge, Ramsay revealed that this season's winner would become the head chef at the Green Valley Ranch Resort and Spa in Las Vegas. Pre-Service: While Brad got the team organized during prep, Aaron struggled to prep the ice cream, needing Rock's help. The women completely isolated Julia due to her being a Waffle House cook, even though she tried to help. To make matters worse, Joanna attempted to dictate over the team and annoyed the women (and Bonnie in particular) for telling them that they were incorrectly prepping the stock for service when they were actually doing it the right way. Sous chef MaryAnn even showed worries for the upcoming service due to Joanna's horrific leadership. Service: Before service, Aaron became over emotional before service, forcing Ramsay to calm him down and hold up the restaurant's opening. The men couldn't get any appetizers out due to Vinnie serving mushy pasta. When Vinnie got caught using water in a risotto after running out of vegetable stock, Ramsay threw him off the station and ordered him to clean dishes for the rest of service. Brad got the remaining appetizers out, but Aaron burned chicken and had to leave service because he felt exhausted, whilst Ramsay had to again calm him down. Josh took over the station, but found out that Aaron had overcooked the team's entire supply of chicken, making it impossible for the team to proceed in service; Sous Chef Scott discovered they were also out of wellingtons and most of their sides, even without any entrées served. For the women, Tiffany and Bonnie failed to cook quail eggs for the scallops, while Julia broke down in tears when Joanna and Tiffany repeatedly berated and insulted her when she tried to help. Ramsay ordered Julia and Melissa to take over, after which they were able to get some of the appetizers out. After seeing Joanna continue to argue with Melissa and several orders of spaghetti returned to the kitchen, Ramsay shut the service down. Ramsay criticized Vinnie for being lazy but otherwise declared the men as the winners since they at least served all their appetizers, while the women, now dubbed "Hell's Bitches" for their in-fighting, couldn't even manage that. Melissa, who had stepped up as a leader, was named the women's best of the worst and told to nominate two women for elimination. Elimination: Melissa nominated Joanna for her bad attitude, and Tiffany for not getting any appetizers out, despite the two attempting to persuade her to nominate Julia. Ramsay eliminated Tiffany for making too many basic mistakes. Tiffany's comment: "I had no idea it was gonna be this intense. I don't want to go home. Nobody wants to go home. But if he was choosing people on heart, he absolutely made the right decision tonight." Ramsay's comment: "To be a great chef, you need great attention to detail, passion, and great work ethic. Tiffany worked hard, but that was it. Nothing else."
24	2	"11 Chefs Compete"	June 11, 2007	8.85
Team challenge: The teams were woken up early to retrieve and prepare Dover sole for dinner service. While bringing the fish in, Aaron claimed to suffer from cramps and Ramsay excused him from the challenge, automatically balancing out the teams. The teams had 30 minutes to carefully remove the skin and extract the roe from as many fishes as possible; Ramsay inspected each one and made a pass/fail determination. The men were let down by Vinnie having neglected to prepare any correctly, though Josh (who was successful in all four attempts), Brad, Eddie and Rock pulled the score up to eight. Melissa single-handedly earned half of this by having four acceptable servings, while Julia had two. Despite Jen and Bonnie failing to earn any and Joanna having only prepared three, all three of hers were acceptable, leading to a victory for the women. Reward/punishment: Ramsay took the women out to sea for lunch and fishing. The men prepared the remaining sole for the dinner service. Service: The men volunteered for Aaron to work in the dining room by deboning the Dover sole when served, which was the 2nd part of their punishment. However, he was seen talking to diners, taking so long to prepare the fish to the point where it was cold and sent back, and even then, he left large bones in the fish. In the kitchen, Eddie didn't speak up loud enough and his teammates swarmed his station, resulting in too much pasta being cooked. After Eddie used way too much pepper in the risotto. Brad took over the starter station, only to serve an overcooked, peppery risotto that was just as bad as Eddie's. Vinnie burned a Dover sole and argued with Ramsay over it. Josh sent up an overcooked Wellington followed by one with raw pastry, and also overcooked chicken, which Ramsay smashed. For the women, Bonnie cooked three orders of scallops when only one was needed, Joanna forgot to cook lettuce for a dish, and Ramsay stopped Melissa from taking over for Joanna on spaghetti. Under Jen's strong leadership, however, the team worked well, and was able to complete their dinner service. Once the women finished, Ramsay threw the men out of the kitchen and had the women complete the service for them. Ramsay singled out Aaron, Eddie, and Vinnie as the worst of the men's team and instructed Rock, the only one not to make any mistakes, to nominate two people for elimination. Elimination: Rock nominated Eddie and Josh. Aaron was surprised Rock didn't put him up, even after volunteering himself. Eddie was ultimately eliminated for failing to control his station. Eddie's comment: "My biggest regret in Hell's Kitchen is just not being loud. I should've just went in full blast and just tore the place apart. Getting kicked off sucks and... But, you know, I did it to myself." Ramsay's comment: "Eddie's got a big heart. Sadly, he couldn't even hold his own section. He made far too many simple mistakes and he didn't merit running his own restaurant."
25	3	"10 Chefs Compete"	June 18, 2007	7.57
Team challenge: The teams' challenge was to make breakfast for the Army (red team) and Navy (blue team). The winner would be the team that completed their breakfast service first. Julia's short order experience led her team from start to finish almost flawlessly, with the only issue being Joanna's hash browns being sent back for being undercooked. Conversely, the men struggled due to Aaron burning omelets. Brad took over the station, only to exacerbate the problem by bringing up the omelets cold. After the women completed their service, Ramsay requested Julia to help the struggling men's team, commenting on her skills in getting the men together (or in his words, "finally a leader"). Reward/punishment: The women were rewarded with a helicopter trip and lunch with Ramsay aboard the USS Midway. The men's punishment was KP duty, preparing a thousand pounds of potatoes and onions for a military base. Aaron fainted as the men began KP duty, and was transported by ambulance to the hospital for treatment. Ramsay instructed the men to have come up with a leader, as their team was suffering without one. Aaron's exit: Before the dinner service, Ramsay called a hospitalized Aaron and said he could no longer participate on the show due to his ongoing illness and doctor's orders, making him the third chef to withdraw from Hell's Kitchen, and the second chef to withdraw for medical reasons. After Ramsay finished the telephone conversation with Aaron, he hung up Aaron's jacket and burned his photo. Ramsay declined to comment on Aaron's departure. Aaron's comment: "I feel disappointed. I mean, I've worked almost 40 years in a kitchen, and for what? I guess I'm coming home." Service: During prep, the team worried about Julia, as she had admitted she did not know what a crème brûlée was. Without Aaron and under Brad's leadership, the men got off to a good start with Rock on appetizers, despite him sweating into a risotto, but got bogged down with the entrees. Vinnie delayed an order of scallops with a raw egg, prompting Ramsay to smash it in Vinnie's chest. Brad was stopped from scraping the burnt part of the pastry of a wellington that he burnt. Josh, who was sent out to take water deliveries as the second part of the men's punishment, was accused of trying to sabotage Brad after saying his turbot wasn't ready. For the women, Bonnie undercooked scallops, and Joanna served salty risotto while failing to notice that she was using rancid crab, which led Ramsay to fire her from the station. Jen and Julia miscommunicated on spaghetti, leading Jen to bin an order of spaghetti they needed before retrieving it from the bin. Despite Ramsay not noticing, Julia stopped her. The appetizers were so backed up in the women's kitchen that all of Jen's wellingtons got overcooked, leading to patrons of both kitchens walking out due to the lengthy delays. Ramsay shut down the service and declared no winner, but only asked the women to nominate two people for elimination. Elimination: The team initially agreed on Joanna and Julia, but Jen was willing to nominate herself instead of Julia. Ramsay immediately sent Julia back in line after her plea. Joanna argued that Jen deserved to go home for considering serving spaghetti from the trash. However, Ramsay instead eliminated Joanna since she actually did serve the rotten crab and refused to accept responsibility for her mistake. Joanna's comment: "Getting kicked out of Hell's Kitchen is not gonna stop me at all. I think by me coming here made me a lot stronger. I'm ready to try to be a better person and achieve my ultimate goal of having my own restaurant." Ramsay's comment: "Not only did Joanna serve rancid crab that could've seriously made a customer ill, she completely gave up, screwed her team, and if you can't handle one individual section, you got no chance of running a business."
26	4	"8 Chefs Compete"	June 25, 2007	7.43
Team challenge: Team members were blindfolded and wore headphones as Ramsay tested their palates with various foods. Julia got two items correct, while Brad only got one. Rock got two while Melissa got one, leaving the score tied at three. Bonnie got two items, while Josh got every single one wrong to give the women a five-three lead. At this point, Ramsay preemptively announced that a tie would go to the women since the men had misidentified so many basic ingredients, which would guarantee them victory unless Jen missed all her items and Vinnie correctly identified all of his. Vinnie immediately misidentified tuna as pancetta, and Ramsay declared the women the winners, meaning that Jen didn't even have to taste anything. Afterwards, Vinnie accused Bonnie of cheating due to an incident where her headphones weren't working, even though it was Bonnie herself who had pointed that out. This was the first time in Hell's Kitchen history that either team lost the first three challenges. Reward/punishment: Ramsay treated the women to lunch at Opaque, a very dark restaurant. The men had to prepare both kitchens for the next dinner service in addition to eating offal such as cow's tongue, liver and kidney. Rock almost threw up and Brad was worried about the domino effect of throw up if Rock threw up. Service: For this service, the customers would fill out comment cards on their food, which would decide the winner. Melissa's first risottos were rejected and she tried to push Julia for a time on scallops even after Bonnie noticed they were overcooked. Ramsay commented that this did not show good leadership. Bonnie put sliced chicken back in the pan, drying it out. Melissa tried to help Bonnie on meat but she confused Bonnie more than anything. Bonnie had trouble understanding Ramsay's instructions, undercooking Wellington and forgetting a chicken before serving dry and shredded portions. Vinnie first overcooked four wellingtons, then tried to flash grill rare Wellingtons in the oven to make them appear medium. After wasting six Wellingtons and a chicken, Ramsay accused him of not caring. Josh made risottos that were not cooked the right way and got kicked off the appetizer station for Rock. Josh wasn't convinced when a customer sent back his spaghetti for being undercooked. With numerous dishes returned from both kitchens, Ramsay warned that if one more dish was brought back from either kitchen, the service would be aborted. After a customer complained of cold chicken, Ramsay stuck to his promise and shut the kitchen down. Both teams lost, since over 65% of the customers said they would not return due to the wait for their food. Ramsay picked Jen, though she had not been outstanding, and Rock to each nominate one person from their team. Elimination: Jen nominated Melissa, due to being close friends with Bonnie. Rock chose Josh, as a tactical move to keep weaker chefs in the competition. Ramsay immediately saw through this and nominated Vinnie and Bonnie. Ramsay eliminated Vinnie for showing no signs of learning from his many mistakes. Vinnie's comment: "I can't do what he does. He's got years of experience on me. He knows what oysters and caviar taste like from Japan. And he knows what spices from India are like, and I don't know that. There's a lot of things that I'd like to do over, but the reality is that, you know, there isn't... There's no second chances in Hell's Kitchen." Ramsay's comment: "Vinnie talks the talk, but he doesn't walk the walk. The bottom line with Vinnie is, he's a crap cook."
27	5	"7 Chefs Compete, Part 1"	July 2, 2007	8.12
Team challenge: Ramsay informed the teams that Hell's Kitchen would be hosting a wedding reception, and that the couple, Carlota and Cyrus, would be stopping by to judge their dishes, with an appetizer, a meat entrée and a fish entrée requested. The teams were sent to Bristol Farms and each given $100 to buy ingredients for their dishes in 30 minutes, with the men initially being over the limit and forced to ditch a bottle of wine at the check-out counter. The teams then had one hour to prepare the dishes, with the men managing by consensus, while Melissa tried to take control of the women's entire menu, to the point where she advised Julia and Jen that they should not listen to Bonnie over her. Just before presenting, Melissa advised Ramsay not to try the women's dishes, but Ramsay warned her to watch her attitude. The men scored on the appetizer and the women scored on the fish entrée. On the meat entrees however, the men served up a perfectly cooked ribeye steak, while the women served a burnt duck breast with no sides whatsoever; Melissa had put the breast back in the oven after Julia initially cooked it, but then forgot about it and left no time to add sides. Jen was embarrassed to present this, feeling the couple would blame her for Melissa's mistake. Upon seeing the result, Ramsay and the couple didn't even bother tasting the women's dish and immediately declared the men as the clear winners, their first challenge win of the season. Before punishment, Melissa got into an argument with her teammates, and continued to boss them around even throughout the punishment. In a deleted scene, Gordon acknowledged Melissa's rudeness towards Bonnie and told Bonnie that she should have argued with Melissa and stood up for herself. Reward/punishment: The men were rewarded with a day of pampering at the Exhale Spa while the women decorated the dining room for the reception, under the directions of Francisco the Party Planner. The women acknowledged that Melissa was their weakest link and that she lost them the challenge. Service: Both teams would have to serve the three winning dishes from the challenge, and the men were given the privilege of cooking for the wedding couple. Melissa repeatedly burned the potato dish and kept accusing Rock of not teaching her the recipe, so Ramsay replaced her with Jen on the potatoes. Nevertheless, Melissa continued to dictate orders, informing Bonnie and Jen that she was four minutes away on ribeye garnish, though when Ramsay asked, she said she was ready. Josh initially screwed up on the risotto, which held up Brad's crab salad and the women, as the wedding couple had to be served first before the rest of the guests. During a moment of inattention, Melissa set down her sabayon, and it promptly fell over in its water bath. She went over to the men's kitchen asking for some of theirs, only for Ramsay to yell at her to fix it from scratch and accuse her of sabotaging the men. When the wedding planner questioned Jean-Phillipe on why the parents of the bride weren't served, he was directed to Ramsay who promptly told him to get out of the way. The kitchens eventually managed to complete their first service. Ramsay's wedding gift to the couple was a stay at the Green Valley Ranch Resort in Las Vegas. The men won for finishing three minutes ahead of the women with Jen being the best of the worst for the second service in the row. Elimination: Jen instantly decided on Melissa but then struggled between Bonnie and Julia before ultimately picking Bonnie as her second nominee for previous mistakes. Team change: Ramsay told Melissa to give him her coat, but instead of eliminating her, he gave Melissa another chance and she was sent over to the men's team, marking the first time in Hell's Kitchen history where nobody was eliminated following a dinner service. However, Ramsay ended on going to put Melissa's red jacket on the coat hook, but stopped short of actually doing it. Ramsay's comment: "I've never seen anyone go from being a strong chef to being such a terrible chef so quickly. And that's why tonight I'm giving Melissa one more chance. Her only hope now is that she fits in better with the boys than she did with the girls."
28	6	"7 Chefs Compete, Part 2"	July 9, 2007	7.51
Team challenge: The two teams were required to make three lobster dishes in one hour. To even out the teams, and in punishment for failing to identify lobster from episode four's taste test, Josh was excluded from the challenge. He was allowed to coach the team, but not allowed to touch a lobster. Also, both teams had to start with fresh lobsters from a tank, which worried Bonnie. Ramsay took notice of this and barked at her, at which point she revealed that she does not like to kill living things. She did, however, overcome her fear to successfully boil her own lobster. Bonnie's grilled lobster salad with baked apples beat Melissa's citrus herb salad with poached lobster, but Rock's buttermilk fried lobster tail beat Julia's lobster risotto, which left the bisque to break the tie. Ramsay complimented both Jen's lobster and crab bisque with saffron and thyme and Brad's lobster bisque with Disaronno chantilly, but he chose Jen's, and the red team triumphed. He later mentioned that this was the hardest decision so far. Reward/punishment: Since the blue team lost their challenge, they had to go through the garbage, separating out the recyclables. Rock was visibly angry with the Chef's decision and grumbled that, although he grew up in a poor neighborhood, he thinks this punishment is a bit extreme. Meanwhile, the red team was taken to a photoshoot for In Touch magazine. Rock was singled out for further punishment, being summoned to the photoshoot and ordered to separate the recyclables from the trash there as well. This made him angrier as he insisted he would never tell his cooks to sort through the trash. Service: Ramsay informed the teams they would be making familiar dishes such as risotto, sea bass, beef wellington, spaghetti, and also Bonnie's newly created lobster salad. As punishment for losing, Josh had to fetch lobster for both teams. The red team had an almost flawless performance, their only problems being Bonnie setting a pan on fire and then failing to put it out quickly and Julia initially sending up the wrong order before correcting it, and then breaking down after Bonnie pushed her to complete about another dish. Despite this, they communicated well and got their food out quickly. For the blue team, Brad made too much risotto before overcooking it, Melissa's scallops were too thin, Josh's mashed potatoes were gloopy and runny, and Melissa overcooked monkfish, eventually running out. After entire table of six sent back their food because their lobster and wellingtons were overcooked, Ramsay ordered the kitchen closed. Ramsay named the blue team losers for having two sous chefs (Josh and Brad), an executive chef (Rock), and a line chef (Melissa), yet getting outcooked by a nanny (Bonnie), a short-order cook (Julia) and a pastry chef (Jen). Elimination: Ramsay had Melissa step forward and eliminated her without even asking the men who they would have chosen or asking her to justify why she should stay, on the belief that she had had more chances than anybody, making her the first contestant to be eliminated without being nominated. He then called down Brad and Josh but after hearing from them, decided to give them another chance. Melissa's comment: "I was the worst person in the blue kitchen tonight. I'm upset that I had to leave. I didn't want to leave. I think Chef Ramsay sent me home tonight because he expected me to perform, and he said he'd give me one chance, and I didn't." Ramsay's comment: "That was really difficult today because Brad and Josh were absolutely horrible. With Melissa, she's very assertive and she sounds like a leader, but unfortunately, she doesn't cook like a leader."
29	7	"6 Chefs Compete"	July 16, 2007	8.25
Team challenge: Each team was given an identical tray of leftovers and instructed to make three courses: one appetizer and two entrees. The winning dishes were judged by Ramsay. Both teams produced equally good appetizers. Both Brad's curry bass with crustacean tomato pasta and Bonnie's rustic chicken stew earned a point, despite Bonnie's lack of confidence in her dish. Ramsay thought that Jen's take on steak and eggs for breakfast lacked originality, while Josh's pea tendril stuffed chicken leg was undercooked, so gave neither of them a point. Rock and Julia were last up. Rock had surf and turf with a petite ribeye and pan-seared bass. Julia's deep-fried sea bass was tasty but not as elegant as Rock's. Ramsay mentioned that it was "just fish and chips". The men won the challenge. Reward/punishment: The men were given the chance to participate in a 3-on-1 paintball match against Ramsay. They jumped at the chance saying how no one ever got the chance to take out frustrations on their boss. Target practice had pictures of Ramsay and the women posted. During the competition, Ramsay managed to beat the three men, taking out Brad, then Josh and Rock last. The women were required to receive, check, and bring in the food delivery for the evening service, with Bonnie in charge of checking/marking the packing slip. Notably, Bonnie missed the fact that unsalted butter and turbot skeletons were delivered instead of the expected salted butter and turbot filets and then got emotional about it after the sous chefs chastised her. The errors meant that the women had to arrange re-delivery of the missing items, working longer than they had expected. Bonnie felt horrible and thought that she would be sent home for her mistakes. Service: Each team had to create a menu of three appetizers, three entrees and three desserts. The diners were allowed to select from either menu for their meal. During the brainstorming of the menus, Bonnie and Jen took control for the women while deriding Julia's "Waffle House background". The men were subjected to Brad's leadership who offered such dishes as "scallops with horseradish spaetzle" and "macaroni & cheese done as a cassoulet". The women's dishes were mostly standard fare, including Julia's last minute add-on of New York strip and shrimp, while the men's dishes were generally fine dining meals created mostly by Brad. Ramsay noted the women lacked stamina, and was upset that they refused to communicate with each other, in a contrast to their previous service. Julia didn't know how to cook Bonnie's rabbit dish. Bonnie tried to cook without turning the gas on, and burned steak garnish on the last ticket. Jen had an attitude most of the night and kept snapping at Bonnie while Ramsay scolded her for doing little to help her team. For the men, Josh had a lamb come back for tasting boiled, while Brad's ravioli was cold and his turbot sauce was bland. Josh undercooked the refired lamb, but Brad and Rock refused to help him; nonetheless, Josh eventually rebounded and managed to successfully serve all of their entrees. Ramsay declared neither team a winner, but named Julia the most consistent chef for the women. Due to her steak and shrimp dish, while initially rejected by the women, being the most popular without a single order being returned, she had the privilege to nominate one of her teammates for elimination, while the men had to pick one nominee on a group consensus. Elimination: Julia nominated Bonnie, while Rock and Josh nominated Brad. Ramsay eliminated Brad because despite his efforts to be a leader, he only performed "as a cook" during the service and attempted to sabotage Josh, which Ramsay considered to be proof that Brad was not a team player. Brad's comment: "Rock and Josh knew that I'm the better chef, and I think it was their decision to vote me off because I was their biggest competition. You know, I still think I'm the best." Ramsay's comment: "Brad was a hard worker. Unfortunately, he worked with his back rather than his brain. He lacked finesse to become a great chef."
30	8	"5 Chefs Compete"	July 23, 2007	8.89
Ramsay congratulated the chefs with champagne flutes, then sprayed them with champagne, with Josh being the only one brave enough to catch it in his mouth. He then told them to go upstairs and put on their black jackets, as they were all now one team. Challenge: Each chef, individually had to prepare 100 portions of a dish for "trendsetters" with meals planned at least one week in advance. They later learned the "trendsetters" was a high school class at Alhambra High School in Alhambra, California. Rock made Kobe beef hamburgers, Josh did salmon with pineapple salsa, Jen served baked chicken fettuccine with an herbed butter sauce, Bonnie made fried goat cheese on salad, and Julia prepared a grilled chicken and cheese sandwich with onion rings. Julia won the challenge with 51% of the votes (the DVD release of the season revealed the full results; Rock finished in second place with 25% of the votes, Jen and Bonnie got around 10% each, while Josh did not get a single vote and finished in last place). Reward/punishment: Julia won a trip to Las Vegas to see the Green Valley Ranch Resort, and was allowed to take one chef along for the trip. She chose Jen. The two also went to the Red Rock Resort to meet Heather West, the winner of the second season, who gave them recipes she had created for her restaurant, and tips for the competition. The other three had to clean the dining room. Service: During prep, Bonnie threw away monkfish she thought was rancid and MaryAnn quickly berated her, as it was the entire stock of monkfish, and it was in fact fresh. The united black team was tasked with serving all 100 tables in the restaurant. Josh got off to a bad start by cooking risottos and spaghetti ahead of order. Julia forgot to serve garnish for Wellingtons and monkfish and talked back to Ramsay. After one of Josh's risottos was returned for being undercooked, he was kicked out and eliminated on the spot. Even Rock overcooked some scallops, and Ramsay told him he had hit "rock-bottom" after forgetting to cook a turbot. As service continued, Jen and Bonnie performed strongly, but Rock's short temper once again got the best of him as he served scallops despite telling Jen he would wait, making Jen seem behind. On desserts, Jen asked for Rock to leave some ice cream to her side, only for Rock to ignore her request and slam it on a surface. As a result, Jen called Rock an "asshole" and Ramsay had to hit the overhead to break up their argument, to which Rock later admitted privately that he was at fault and apologized to Jen, who forgave him. In the end, the four chefs were able to successfully complete the dinner service. Automatic elimination: Josh did not serve a single acceptable appetizer and became the first contestant (and, as of Season 23, the only black jacket contestant) in Hell's Kitchen history to be eliminated mid-service. First, he twice cooked too many portions of risotto and spaghetti before they were ordered. When one of the risottos that Josh did manage to get out was sent back because it was undercooked, Ramsay reached the end of his patience and furiously ordered Josh to take off his jacket and leave. Josh was shown leaving Hell's Kitchen via the delivery entrance with his bags. Until Season 13, he was also the only black jacket to not receive a retrospective montage upon elimination. At the start of episode 10 during a recap of the past episodes, Josh and Julia's pictures were burned side-by-side and their jackets got hooked simultaneously. Ramsay declined to comment on Josh's departure. Josh's comment: "I would have given my right arm to stay in the service and keep fighting, because I came here with a dream to win. And it appears it's over. It appears that Green Valley Ranch is not in my future. Dream's over, guys." Elimination: Ramsay made it clear that even though Josh was already eliminated, one other chef would still be sent home tonight. Bonnie was declared the best of the service, and had to choose two for elimination. She immediately decided on Rock, but struggled between Julia and Jen before picking Julia. In the end, Ramsay eliminated Julia for her lack of experience, leaving the other contestants shocked and distraught, in particular Bonnie, who later stated how she felt guilty about having Julia eliminated. Though in a break from his usual heavy criticism, Ramsay heaped praise on how far she progressed in spite of her Waffle House background. In an unprecedented move so far on Hell's Kitchen, he said he would personally send Julia to culinary school and invite her to come back and win it all once she has finished. Julia's comment: "I'm just trying to do my best. I think that people underestimated me. I know that Chef Ramsay is only hard on us to make us better, because it made me so much better. I know that great things will come on this, you know? Just starting with culinary art school. I made it really far, but I don't want to go home." Ramsay's comment: "To become a great chef, you must have a natural ability. Clearly, Julia does have it. All she needs is a little more experience. After that, she'll be ready to run her own restaurant."
31	9	"3 Chefs Compete"	July 30, 2007	8.59
Challenge: Ramsay started the challenge by bringing in his mother and having her present her own macaroni and cheese and then producing his own in a more elegant version. He then told each chef to randomly select one of the 5 covered dishes and change it to a gourmet dish. Rock's turned out to be spaghetti, Bonnie's was Franks and Beans, and Jen's ended up being fried chicken. Bonnie spent a large portion of her time not knowing what franks and beans even was. After having one hour to complete their dishes Ramsay brought in their mothers to judge. Bonnie did an Italian version of beans and franks, mini bruschettas with a mushroom cream leek sauce. Rock made spaghetti three different ways: cream sauce, veal, and spicy chorizo and pork. Jen did a fried chicken roulade stuffed with crab meat, spinach and goat cheese. The chefs' mothers were seated with their backs to their children so could judge without knowing who made which dish. All three contestants were in tears at this surprise. Jen won the challenge after all three mothers chose her stuffed fried chicken breasts as the best dish. Bonnie's mother later admitted she knew which one was Bonnie's but voted for Jen's anyway. Reward/punishment: Jen and Ramsay went out to lunch with their mothers at The Lodge Steakhouse. Afterwards, Ramsay dropped Jen off at Surfas, a kitchen supply store, and gave her $1000 to go shopping with. At the end of the episode, Jen was shown spending almost $300 buying Kasumi steak knives as gifts for Bonnie and Rock. Rock and Bonnie had to work together to clean the dormitories where Bonnie complained the whole time. Rock noted that she knew surprisingly little about cleaning for being a professional nanny. Bonnie admitted that she is really only a "nanny" in that she sometimes watches her clients' kids while performing as their personal chef. Service: Before dinner service, Ramsay had each contestant practice their angriest dressing down to his face. Bonnie noted how satisfying it was to have the rare opportunity to curse at Ramsay for a change. Jen struggled being serious but included many expletives to get her point across. Rock also struggled with coming across effectively. During service, Ramsay made each contestant work the pass, calling out orders and putting the finishing touches on dishes before handing them off to the servers. Ramsay tested each contestant on their leadership, time management, and quality control. He had sous-chefs Scott and Mary Ann deliberately sabotage dishes to see if the contestants would catch the mistakes. Jen was the first to work the pass, where she missed a spaghetti dish that went out without any crab and, as a result, began sending dishes back even though they were edible. Though she recovered her composure and caught an overcooked and underseasoned risotto, her lack of experience was shown in her leadership. She also ran out of risottos near the end of service, due to overcooking the rice. Rock caught a monkfish being sent out without ham, though was criticized for plating the dishes too slowly and not being vocal enough; Bonnie pointed out that he was an executive chef and should have performed better. Lastly, Bonnie struggled in calling off orders, though spotted an undercooked pigeon and Jen's risotto with no salt, and gained confidence over time. Ramsay praised them all for the best service so far, before instructing them to come up with a reason why they should stay. Elimination: All three went back to the dorm and Jen questioned Bonnie's motive for wanting to stay asking her if this is really what she wanted. Jen didn't feel as though this was a serious dream for Bonnie, not helped by the fact that Bonnie admitted she was unsure if she wanted it because of her limited experience. All were called before Ramsay and explained their reasons to stay. Ramsay called Rock's name first, giving everyone the impression that he was about to be sent home, and said that he had made the final two. Ramsay then decided to eliminate Jen but praised her for her talent and determination. Jen's elimination had upset both Bonnie and Rock, as she had become close with both of them, and they both admitted they wanted to see Jen reach the final. After the elimination, Ramsay surprised Rock and Bonnie with a visit from Rock's wife, son, and daughter and Bonnie's parents. A tarp rolls down from above, symbolically splitting the restaurant into two sections for the next show. Jen's comment: "I'm from a small town. And things like this don't happen to people like us every day. I'm gonna be successful. I know I am. I tried so hard, and I sacrificed so much so far. And it just wasn't enough."
32	10	"2 Chefs Compete"	August 6, 2007	8.90
Before the episode started, Jen's jacket was hung and her picture burned. Remodeling: As with the previous seasons, Hell's Kitchen is separated into two sides, red side for Bonnie and blue side for Rock. Both chefs begin planning for their side of restaurant, including decor, staff uniforms and menus. Both chefs get to meet an architect which would help them complete what they want for their side of the restaurant, while Jean-Philippe assists both with selection of their servers' uniforms. Bonnie wants to go with a French bistro feel where nothing matches, there are no booths, and servers are required to wear all black. Rock wants a simple black/black design with servers in jeans which Jean-Philippe quickly dismissed. Bonnie's menu is reflective of her favorite dishes with her signature dish being her prawn fettuccine while Rock's is based on southern food with his surf and turf of fried chicken and crab cakes as his starter. Bonnie seemed to flow with ideas about her restaurant while Rock struggled to decide on most of the aspects. Challenge: After they have selected their restaurant's decor, the two chefs travel to Las Vegas with Ramsay on a private plane and are given a tour of the Green Valley Ranch Resort. In a surprise challenge, Ramsay tells the final two they have thirty minutes to create their specialty dish (listed above) and present it to the top chefs of Las Vegas. The dishes are judged by seven judges, including other chefs from Las Vegas restaurants, Robin Leach, seasons one and two Hell's Kitchen winners Michael Wray and Heather West, respectively, and the duo of the owner and head chef of the Green Valley Ranch Resort who cast the deciding vote. Bonnie won the challenge four votes to three. The last six eliminated chefs (Julia, Jen, Brad, Josh, Melissa, and Vinnie) were reunited with the final two. Julia was very emotional, struggling with the disappointment of not making it to the finale, plus the fact that Bonnie chose Julia over Jen to be up on the chopping block in the first place. Julia privately admitted that she was rooting for Rock, though stated she was not going to let this ruin her dinner service. Rock and Bonnie chose their team for the season finale, with Bonnie selecting first for winning the previous challenge. Bonnie chooses Jen, Melissa, and Julia, while Rock chooses Brad, Vinnie, and was left with Josh. Julia was bitter over Bonnie choosing Melissa before herself, though Bonnie admitted she only did so as Julia may hinder the team by being emotional. Rock passed over Julia knowing he would end up with Josh, saying that he understood Josh and more importantly because Julia's feelings could be a liability even though he considered her better than Josh. In the end, both retain the same team members they had from the start of the season, resulting in all-male and all-female teams. However, this episode ended with a cliffhanger of sorts.
33	11	"Winner Announced"	August 13, 2007	9.68
Preparations: Continuing from the previous episode, Rock organized his team well while Bonnie took a relaxed and laid back approach, admitting she had not cooked most of her items. In the kitchen while planning recipes, Julia frequently snapped at Bonnie, while Rock convinced Josh that he is capable and just needs self-confidence to perform well. The two finalists presented their appetizers and entrees to Ramsay; Bonnie's goat cheese salad and her signature prawn fettuccine, Rock's surf and turf (fried chicken and crab cakes) and rib-eye steak. For desserts, Ramsay tells Bonnie that her chocolate truffle assortment is on the small side, while advising Rock to serve his milkshake (and chocolate chip cookies) in martini glasses instead of a huge tall glass. Ramsay then toured their halves of the restaurant asking for their redesign explanations and had no complaints. Before service starts, Ramsay presents Bonnie and Rock with their own head chef's jackets. Service: Rock's team struggled early with Josh constantly burning the crab cakes and putting them 30 minutes behind. After a warning from Ramsay that Josh was ruining everything, Rock made a decisive move to switch Josh and Vinnie's stations, and from then on there were no more major problems. Rock pledged that he would work every station to make the food perfect and even started cooking dishes himself when the others couldn't handle. Bonnie's team started out strong on the appetizers, but Melissa overcooked the prawns and Julia worked slowly on garnish while refusing to give times. They were soon plagued by lack of communication, particularly as Jen and especially Julia didn't take Bonnie seriously, and an emotional Julia defied orders which, in turn, led to Bonnie tuning her out. After two orders of fettuccine were returned for being undercooked and cold, Bonnie realized that they had run out of prawns due to portion mismanagement and had no other seafood ready to go, forcing her to send out the rest of the orders with only pasta. Dessert went smoothly for both sides. Winner: During the debrief, Ramsay asked each chef what they would have changed. Rock stated that he would have won the challenge to get Jen with the first pick, complimenting her cooking skills (which made Jen feel honored), while saying that Josh "really screwed up" and would have been left off his team (which slightly angered Josh). Bonnie admitted that she was not careful in monitoring portion sizes and thus ran out of ingredients. Ramsay had no substantial criticism for either chef, only saying, "You both came out with leadership qualities", noting that Bonnie has improved her assertiveness while Rock was considered "rock-solid". Ramsay considered all aspects in making his decision, including how each chef ran the kitchen and every customer feedback card. Both Rock and Bonnie stood in front of the two doors and whoever's door opened would be the winner. Rock broke down in tears when his door opened and was declared the winner of Hell's Kitchen Season 3, and Bonnie immediately went to congratulate him. Bonnie's comment: "I am so happy for Rock. I think Chef Ramsay did make the right decision. I'm not worried about myself. I think that the right opportunity will find me." Rock's comment: "This is just so big for me and my family. I just won! Thank God, I just won! I owe everything I do for my family. The fact that I finished and I completed shows my son, shows my daughter, that if you really stick your mind to something, you can do it! It's good to come home with a quarter million dollars. Holla!" Ramsay's comment: "Rock deserved to win Hell's Kitchen because he's a very confident cook and he has become a really good leader. He can motivate staff, he can create. All those qualities are not easy to find in one chef. Rock holds all of them."
