= David Meister =

American fashion designer (born 1962)

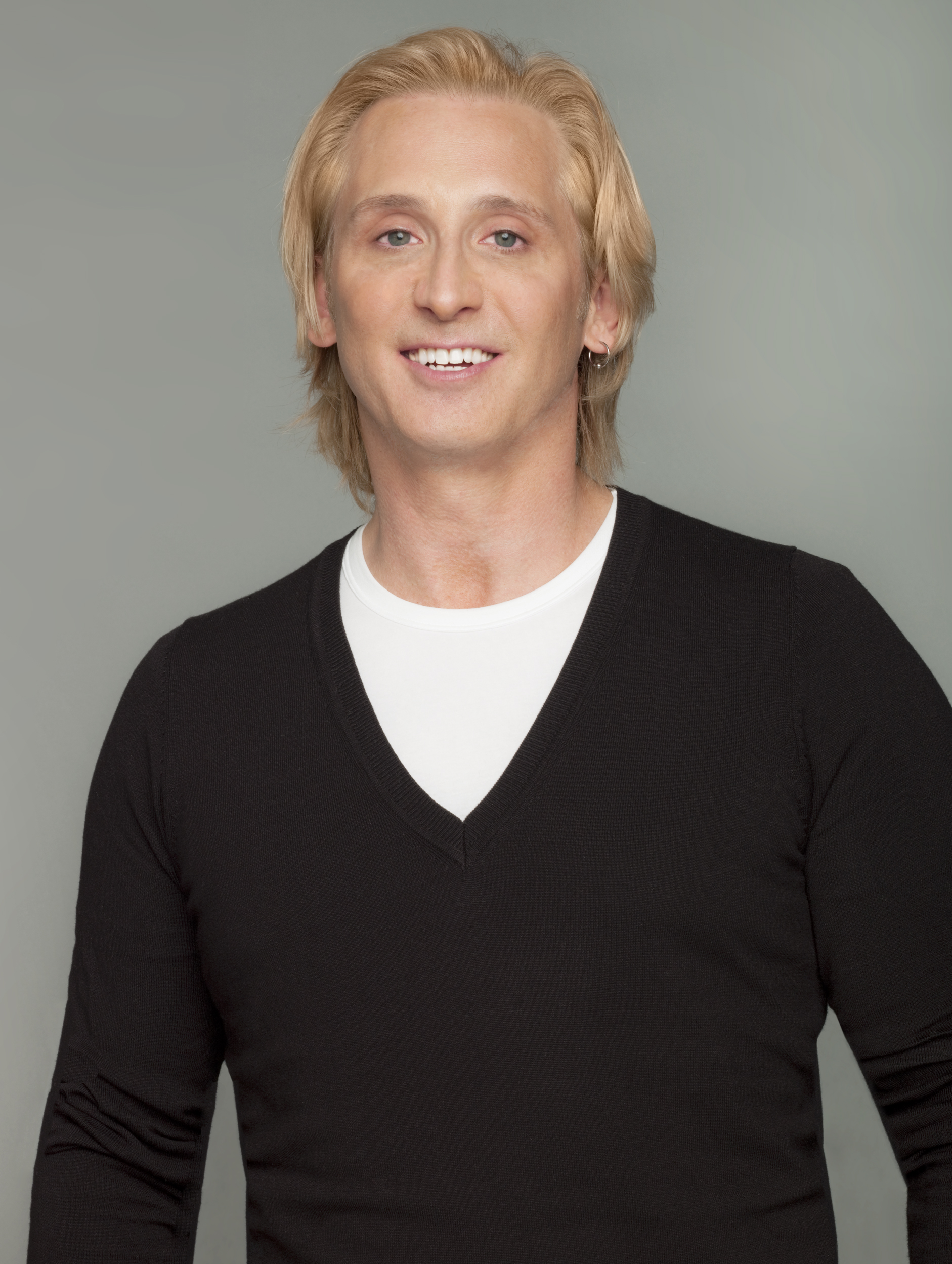
- Born: February 23, 1962 (age 64); Cincinnati, Ohio
- Education: University of Cincinnati
- Occupation: Fashion designer

David Meister (born February 23, 1962) is an American fashion designer known for his women’s wear. As a young child in Cincinnati, David was heavily influenced by style-conscious TV shows such as Sonny & Cher, which fueled his aspiration of becoming a fashion designer.

Born and raised in Cincinnati, Ohio, Meister graduated from La Salle High School (Cincinnati, Ohio) in 1980. He then earned a degree in fashion design from The University of Cincinnati College of Design, Art, Architecture and Planning in 1985. After graduation, he moved to New York City and secured a position at Danskin.

In November 1998, Meister joined forces with a Californian division of Kellwood Company, to create a signature evening collection. Five months later, he premiered his first fall line, a compilation of modern and elegant eveningwear.

In August 2009, Meister launched his Signature collection exclusively at Bergdorf Goodman.

He launched his exclusive Bridal Collection with Designer Bride in 2010 consisting of twelve styles available at bridal boutiques nationwide.

His dresses, evening wear and couture red carpet designs have been worn by socialites and celebrities. Diane Lane chose Meister for the 2009 Screen Actors Guild (SAG) Awards. Meister is a member of the Council of Fashion Designers of America. His label can be found at venues such as Neiman Marcus, Bloomingdale's and Saks Fifth Avenue.
