= Scott Leibfried =

American chef and culinary consultant (born 1971)

- Born: March 9, 1971 (age 55); New York City, U.S.
- Education: Johnson & Wales University
- Spouse: Christine Fazzino
- Children: Riley Leibfried
- Culinary career
- Current restaurant: Soleil @k
- Television show(s): Hell's Kitchen Food Network Challenge

Scott Leibfried is an American chef and culinary consultant best known for his work hosting and participating in cooking-related competition programs Hell's Kitchen and the Food Network Challenge. Leibfried was born in New York City as the younger of two children.

== Career ==
After graduating from Johnson & Wales University, Leibfried spent most of his time working in the US Northeast and Europe, before relocating to the West Coast of the United States in 1997 to work as a chef at the Four Seasons Hotel in Beverly Hills, California. In 2002, he left for the executive chef position at the Napa Valley Grille in Los Angeles. He soon moved to London to work at a variety of restaurants under the guidance of Gordon Ramsay.

In 2006, Leibfried became the executive chef at Soleil @K in San Diego.

In August 2012, Leibfried became the corporate chef at Fleetwood's restaurant in Maui. Because of this, he left his position on Hell's Kitchen as the blue team's sous chef after the series' first ten seasons, and was replaced by James Avery for the eleventh season.

Leibfried currently serves as chief culinary officer at Greensbury Market. He co-owns and serves as the executive culinary creator at the Italian restaurant Fontana Di Vino in Charlotte, North Carolina.

== Television ==
- Leibfried appeared as Gordon Ramsay's blue kitchen sous-chef on the first ten seasons of the American edition of Hell's Kitchen.
- He hosted the Food Network Challenge cooking competition series during season 1 on the Food Network.
- Leibfried also appeared on Kitchen Nightmares during the season 1 episode 16 "J Willy's" and the season 2 episode 5 "Lido di Manhattan Beach".
