= Hell's Kitchen (American TV series) season 11 =

Hell's Kitchen
- Season 11
- Promotional poster for season 11, featuring host Ramsay
- Hosted by: Gordon Ramsay
- No. of contestants: 20
- Winner: Ja'Nel Witt
- Runner-up: Mary Poehnelt
- No. of episodes: 22

Release
- Original network: Fox
- Original release: March 12 – July 25, 2013

Season chronology
- ← Previous; Season 10 Next → Season 12

Season 11 of the American competitive reality television series Hell's Kitchen and premiered on Fox on March 12, 2013, and concluded on July 25, 2013. Gordon Ramsay returned as host and head chef, while Andi Van Willigan returned as the Red Team's sous-chef. James Avery debuted as the Blue Team's sous-chef, replacing Scott Leibfried, who had a work obligation at Mick Fleetwood's restaurant in Maui. Seasons 1–7 maître d' Jean-Philippe Susilovic returned as maître d', replacing James Lukanik.

The season was filmed between August and September 2012.

The season was won by executive chef Ja'Nel Witt, with butcher/line cook Mary Poehnelt finishing second. However, one month after the season aired, Witt denied the head chef position at Gordon Ramsay Pub & Grill at Caesars Palace in Las Vegas, due to "unforeseen personal circumstances". As of June 2014, she is the executive chef of Corner Table, a canteen based in River Oaks, Houston.

Third-place finisher Jon Scallion, who was deemed by Ramsay as the only great chef on the worst Blue Team in Hell's Kitchen history, became sous-chef at Gordon Ramsay Steak under season 10 winner Christina Wilson.

== Chefs ==
For the first time ever, 20 chefs competed in season 11.

Contestant	Age	Occupation	Hometown	Result
Ja'Nel Witt	31	Executive Chef	Houston, Texas	Winner
Mary Poehnelt	26	Butcher/Line Cook	Belchertown, Massachusetts	Runner-Up
Jonathan "Jon" Scallion	27	Chef de Cuisine	York, Pennsylvania	Eliminated before Finals
Cyndi Stanimirov	25	Head Chef	Queens, New York	Eliminated before Finals
Susan Heaton Fierro	29	Culinary Student	Whittier, California	Eliminated after Fifteenth Service
Zachary "Zach" Womack	34	Head Line Cook	Philadelphia, Pennsylvania	Eliminated after Thirteenth Service
Anthony Rodriguez	27	Line Chef	New Orleans, Louisiana	Eliminated after Twelfth Service
Nedra Harris	24	Kitchen Manager	Detroit, Michigan	Eliminated after Eleventh Service
Michael Langdon	33	Executive Chef	Plains, Pennsylvania	Eliminated after Tenth Service
Raymond "Ray" Alongi	51	Executive Chef	Boston, Massachusetts	Eliminated after Ninth Service
Barret Beyer	35	Head Chef	Long Island, New York	Eliminated after Eighth Service
Amanda Giblin	28	Executive Chef	Orange County, New York	Eliminated after Eighth Service
Jacqueline Baldassari	27	Roundsman	Florence, New Jersey	Eliminated after Seventh Service
Daniel "Dan" Ryan	27	Head Cook	Westchester, New York	Eliminated after Sixth Service
Jessica Lewis	25	Chef Tournant	New York, New York	Eliminated after Fifth Service
Jeremy Madden	22	Lead Cook	Los Angeles, California	Eliminated after Breakfast Service
Danielle Boorn	33	Executive Chef	Atlanta, Georgia	Eliminated after Third Service
Christian Rosati	38	Line Cook/Sandwich Maker	Boston, Massachusetts	Eliminated after Second Service
Gina Aloise	49	Line Cook	The Bronx, New York	Quit before Lobster Challenge
Sebastian Royo	32	Sous Chef	Brooklyn, New York	Eliminated after First Service

== Contestant progress ==
No.	Chef	Original teams											1st switch		2nd switch	Individuals			Finals
No.	Chef	1101/1102	1103	1104	1105/1106/1107			1108	1109	1110/1111		1112/1113		1114/1115	1116	1117/1118	1119	1120	1121/1122
1	Ja'Nel	WIN	LOSE	LOSE	LOSE	LOSE	LOSE	WIN	LOSE	LOSE	LOSE	WIN	LOSE	WIN	WIN	IN	NOM	IN	WINNER
2	Mary	WIN	NOM	LOSE	NOM	NOM	LOSE	WIN	LOSE	LOSE	LOSE	WIN	LOSE	WIN	WIN	IN	NOM	IN	RUNNER-UP
3	Jon	LOSE	LOSE	WIN	WIN	LOSE	LOSE	LOSE	WIN	LOSE	LOSE	LOSE	LOSE	BoW (Note: Jon was also granted immunity for winning the challenge)	WIN	IN	IN	OUT	Mary's team
4	Cyndi	WIN	LOSE	LOSE	LOSE	LOSE	LOSE	WIN	LOSE	NOM	LOSE	WIN	LOSE	WIN	NOM	NOM	IN	OUT	Ja'Nel's team
5	Susan	WIN	LOSE	LOSE	LOSE	LOSE	NOM	WIN	LOSE	LOSE	LOSE	WIN	NOM	WIN	NOM	NOM	OUT		Ja'Nel's team
6	Zach	LOSE	LOSE	WIN	WIN	LOSE	LOSE	LOSE	WIN	NOM	NOM	NOM	LOSE	NOM	OUT				Ja'Nel's team
7	Anthony	LOSE	LOSE	WIN	WIN	LOSE	LOSE	LOSE	WIN	LOSE	LOSE	LOSE	LOSE	OUT					Mary's team
8	Nedra	WIN	LOSE	LOSE	LOSE	NOM	LOSE	WIN	LOSE	LOSE	NOM	WIN	OUT						Mary's team
9	Michael	LOSE	LOSE	WIN	WIN	LOSE	LOSE	LOSE	WIN	LOSE	LOSE	OUT							Mary's team
10	Ray	LOSE	LOSE	WIN	WIN	NOM	NOM	LOSE	WIN	LOSE	OUT								Ja'Nel's team
11	Barret	LOSE	LOSE	WIN	WIN	LOSE	LOSE	NOM	WIN	OUT									
12	Amanda	WIN	LOSE	LOSE	LOSE	LOSE	LOSE	WIN	NOM	OUT									Ja'Nel's team
13	Jacqueline	WIN	LOSE	NOM	NOM	LOSE	LOSE	WIN	OUT										
14	Dan	LOSE	LOSE	WIN	WIN	NOM	NOM	OUT											Mary's team
15	Jessica	WIN	LOSE	NOM	LOSE	LOSE	OUT												
16	Jeremy	NOM	NOM	WIN	OUT														
17	Danielle	WIN	NOM	OUT															
18	Christian	LOSE	OUT																
19	Gina	WIN	LEFT																
20	Sebastian	OUT																	

Keywords

- WIN = Won the dinner service
- LOSE = Lost the dinner service
- BoB = Best of the Best, usually exempt from nomination
- BoW = Best of the Worst, sometimes exempt from nomination
- IN = not nominated for elimination
- NOM = nominated for elimination
- OUT = eliminated normally
- LEFT = withdrew from competition
- HOSP = eliminated due to hospitalization
- EJEC = eliminated during service

Color key
Chef was eliminated after regular nomination
Chef was eliminated after Ramsay's nomination
Chef was eliminated without nomination
Chef was eliminated from winning team
Chef was eliminated in the Cook For Your Life challenge
Chef was nominated to participate in the Cook For Your Life challenge
Chef was eliminated during service
Chef withdrew from the competition
Chef was the Best of the Best/Worst
Chef was retained after regular nomination
Chef was retained after Ramsay's nomination
Chef's nomination was voided
The winner of Hell's Kitchen
The runner-up of Hell's Kitchen

== Episodes ==
No. overall	No. in season	Title	Original release date	U.S. viewers (millions)
145	1	"20 Chefs Compete Part 1"	March 12, 2013	5.30
20 contestants arrived at Los Angeles International Airport to board a bus to Hell's Kitchen, but the bus instead drove in a circle and left them off at Terminal 1 where Chef Ramsay arranged them a flight via Southwest Airlines to Las Vegas. The contestants cooked their signature dishes at Caesars Palace, in front of a live audience for the first time in Hell's Kitchen history. Once again, the teams were divided up between men (blue team) and women (red team). Team challenge/signature dish: Both teams had 45 minutes to prepare their signature dish, judged by Ramsay. Neither Barret's pork loin roulade nor Danielle's chicken parmesan breast and grilled asparagus scored a point (Barret's dish had too much garlic, and Danielle's dish was burnt), Nedra's rosemary-glazed lamb and grilled potatoes scored over Sebastian's shrimp and salmon corndogs, and neither Jeremy's stuffed steak nor Susan's lamb and couscous scored a point (Ramsay even threatened Susan with on-the-spot elimination for serving raw lamb). Ja'Nel's Thai grilled prawns and Ray's stuffed veal cutlet both scored a point, neither Gina's penne and meatballs nor Dan's eggs Benedict scored a point, Amanda and Jon's dishes both scored a point, Michael's dish scored over Cyndi's dish, Jessica's pan-seared wahoo scored over Anthony's barbecue scallop po'boy, and Christian's pasta and eggplant scored over Mary's pan-seared duck breast (Mary's duck was raw). Lastly, Jacqueline's roasted magret duck breast scored over Zach's grilled pork chop (Zach's dish was slightly dry, despite having a good taste), giving the women a 5–4 win. Reward/punishment: The women received the VIP treatment at Caesars Palace, where they met Celine Dion and saw her show. Upon arriving at Hell's Kitchen, Gina annoyed her teammates, especially Nedra, by showing them her puppet, Alfredo Al Dente, instead of studying the menu. The men had to ride back to Los Angeles in a school bus with no air conditioning for eight hours, during which Sebastian's constant chattering annoyed all his teammates, and arrived at Hell's Kitchen almost an hour after the women. Gina's illness: Ramsay guaranteed that service would be completed, but Gina, feeling unwell, left the kitchen as the episode ended in a cliffhanger.
146	2	"20 Chefs Compete Part 2"	March 12, 2013	5.78
Gina's illness - continued: Continued from the previous episode, Gina returned just before service. Service: Deborah Ann Woll and Owain Yeoman were in attendance for opening night as one of the blue and red diners respectively. Amanda and Christian served table-side mussels. Sebastian served under-cooked risotto and spicy pasta, and was thrown out for addressing Zach as "Zacky Wacky". He attempted to return three times before being threatened with elimination, triggering a frenzy of ejections from the men's kitchen; Michael and Barret for serving raw lamb and overcooked wellington, Jeremy for not being able to repeat orders, Jon and Dan for serving under-cooked risotto and garnish, Ray for tasting risotto with his fingers, and Anthony for serving bland risotto, leaving Zach, Christian, and the sous chefs to complete their service. In the women's kitchen, Gina was kicked out for serving raw scallops (even though she cooked the first set of scallops perfectly), followed by Susan for serving undercooked potatoes, Danielle for getting orders mixed up and trying to argue that she had never cooked on a brigade before, and Jacqueline for doing nothing instead of helping Mary. However, Cyndi and Jessica had strong performances on meat, despite Jessica taking over three minutes to slice lamb, and the women also completed service. They were named winners for having fewer members kicked out, though Ramsay also praised Zach. This marked the third season in a row where the women won the opening night dinner service. Elimination: The men nominated Jeremy and Sebastian despite also considering Michael for his issues on meat. Ramsay eliminated Sebastian for his unprofessional attitude and refusing to accept his ejection from the kitchen properly. Sebastian's comment: "Right now, I'm disappointed with myself. I came here thinking that the challenge was gonna be to beat the other chefs and win Hell's Kitchen, and I found a way to defeat myself. Hell's Kitchen, man, is no joke." Ramsay's comment: "Sebastian tried to be funny, but it was his cooking that was the joke."
147	3	"19 Chefs Compete"	March 19, 2013	4.59
The chefs were woken up by a team of soldiers, who ordered the chefs outside for their next challenge. Gina's exit: Before Ramsay announced what the next challenge would be, Gina interrupted him and said that she was withdrawing from the competition, claiming she had some personal issues to attend to (in reality, she did not want to be there anymore as she felt that she was being treated unfairly by her team). This marked the first time that a contestant quit prior to a challenge. Neither Gina nor Ramsay commented on her departure. Team challenge: Following a wall-climbing demonstration from the soldiers, each team had five minutes to climb the wall and retrieve as many lobsters as possible. During the last minute, Anthony fell off the wall and sprained his ankle, but nevertheless refused to go to the hospital and decided to continue. The men won this portion 37-31, only for Ramsay to then announce the real challenge: to remove meat from as many lobsters as possible in 10 minutes; the women won 11–8. Reward/punishment: The women were rewarded with a sushi lunch and massages on a yacht with Ramsay. The men took in deliveries of fish and prepped them for service. In addition, they had fish head soup for lunch. Service: Jalen Rose was a guest for this service while Nedra and Jeremy served table-side lobster. In the women's kitchen, Mary and Danielle both put too much white wine in risotto until Ja'Nel stepped in, and the women were kicked out after Susan undercooked lamb. In the men's kitchen, Christian overcooked scallops repeatedly and had trouble coordinating with Zach on appetizers, Jeremy could not remember which table ordered lobster, and after Christian rejected Jeremy's help, Ramsay forced Jeremy and Christian to eat their mistakes. The men were kicked out after Jon overcooked lamb. Ramsay named both teams losers. Elimination: The men nominated Jeremy and Christian while the women nominated Danielle and Mary. Ramsay sent both Jeremy and Danielle back in line and eliminated Christian for being the main reason for the men's collapse. Ramsay then told Jeremy to stay behind as the episode ended in a cliffhanger. He gave no comment on Christian's elimination. Christian's comment: "Hey, I'm a Boston guy. I had my Bill Buckner moment. I froze at a big time, but I didn't get my second chance to fight, which really pissed me off. Chef Ramsay made a big mistake by getting rid of this Boston guy."
148	4	"17 Chefs Compete"	March 26, 2013	4.68
In the recap, Gina and Christian's jackets were hanged and their pictures were burned. An additional picture-burning sequence was conducted for Gina's puppet, Alfredo. Elimination – continued: Ramsay told Jeremy to be more vocal and step up his game after two poor performances. Team challenge: A volunteer from each team raced with runners including Maurice Greene, Natalie Coughlin, and Danell Leyva in a special "HK3K" mini-marathon for obesity awareness, while their teammates prepped the kitchen for a lunch service that would follow; service would then start when one chef returned to the kitchen, and the first team to complete their service would win. Ramsay chose Mary (who did not volunteer) and Dan to run in the race; Dan returned to Hell's Kitchen before Mary, causing the women to fall behind. Susan needed Nedra's help to prepare smoothies and Danielle was slow on sweet potato fries, but the women caught up, largely due to Zach undercooking salmon and then lying to Ramsay about attempting to serve a previously rejected portion. The women won their third consecutive challenge and helped the men finish the service. This marked the second season in a row where the men lost the first three challenges, as well as the first two services. Reward/punishment: The women flew in a private jet to Monte De Oro Winery in Temecula, California, where they had lunch and made their own wine by squishing grapes with their feet. The men cleaned the race route and prepped both kitchens. Service: In attendance for this service were Kristi Yamaguchi and Ryan Hollins. Cyndi and Jeremy served tableside Greek salad. In the men's kitchen, Michael was berated for asking for a ticket to be read slower, Ray served crunchy risotto to Hollins and burned another portion, but recovered, and Dan sent under-cooked and poorly sliced lamb while constantly arguing with Michael on garnish, forcing Ramsay to send them to the storeroom to cool off. In the women's kitchen, Jessica served too many portions of risotto, but recovered. Danielle served overcooked wellingtons twice but also managed to recover. Jacqueline served raw chicken and had trouble slicing it, requiring Nedra's help. Both teams completed service; Ramsay named the men winners for their improvement, deeming the women's service as their worst yet. Elimination: Danielle and Jessica were nominated but Chef Ramsay also nominated Jacqueline. After Jessica's plea, Ramsay sent her back in line, the he also sent Jacqueline back in line and eliminated Danielle for her lack of confidence, composure, and not showing improvement after three services. Danielle's comment: "Chef Ramsay, I'm sorry that you didn't get the opportunity to see me in my true form. Unfortunately, I wasn't able to pick up and grasp this kitchen as quickly as expected. I'm very thankful, and I'm grateful that I made it this far. I just wish that I had made it further." Ramsay's comment: "Every dinner service, Danielle looked like a deer in the headlights, and that's why she ended up as dead meat."
149	5	"16 Chefs Compete Part 1"	April 2, 2013	4.91
Team challenge: Both teams sampled five meat dishes and had to correctly guess the protein used in the dish. The team to guess all five quicker would win. The men finished in 10 minutes and 33 seconds, mostly due to Michael and Jon being slow on turkey meatballs and swordfish. The women won by finishing three minutes and 56 seconds faster than the men, marking the second time in Hell's Kitchen history that a team had lost four challenges in a row, since Season 9's blue team. Reward/punishment: The women spent the day at Malibu Beach where they took wakeboarding lessons with Laird Hamilton and played volleyball with Gabrielle Reece. The men took in a delivery of wheat, used mortar and pestles to grind the wheat into flour by hand and baked bread with it. During the punishment, Jeremy collapsed due to exhaustion and was sent to the emergency room, but later returned after being informed that the cause for his collapse was not eating enough food. Service: For the first time in Hell's Kitchen history, breakfast would be served during the main service instead of dinner. The customers were emergency medical technicians and emergency room personnel, and the first team to complete service would win. The women took a huge early lead as Ray underseasoned scrambled eggs and Jeremy lost track of orders before serving one of Ramsay's sample dishes. However, Nedra served Eggs Benedict with soggy buns, needing Amanda's help, and Jacqueline burned pancakes while Nedra pointed out that she would have trouble flipping pancakes with a rubber spatula. The men caught up, and due to Jacqueline again burning pancakes for the final ticket, finished their service first, earning them their second successive service win. Elimination: The women initially agreed on Jacqueline and Nedra, but Nedra angrily refused to be nominated and pushed the team to nominate Mary instead (even though she didn't make any mistakes this service). Despite Ramsay feeling Nedra should have been nominated (even expressing shock when she blamed her problems with the pancakes on the spatula she was using), Ramsay accepted Jacqueline and Mary as the nominees. However, after hearing their pleas, Ramsay sent them both back in line and announced that someone else would be eliminated as the episode ended in a cliffhanger.
150	6	"16 Chefs Compete Part 2"	April 9, 2013	4.53
Elimination – continued: Ramsay eliminated Jeremy, whose attempt to serve a sample plate could have made a customer sick, and because he felt Jeremy was in over his head along with a string of poor performances, making him the fourth chef to be eliminated despite being on a winning team, following Carol Scott (Season 5), Salvatore Coppola (Season 7), and Raj Brandston (Season 8). He then told the men that since they won service, their "reward" was losing dead weight. Ramsay gave no comment on Jeremy's elimination. Jeremy's comment: "I don't know what I was thinking. It was my fault. I brought up the wrong plate. But I've learned a lot about myself. I know I'm a fighter. And above all, I'm a great chef." Service: Ramsay announced that there will be no team challenge and instead announced the next dinner service. Prior to service, Jean-Philippe and the wait staff talked about their horror stories working with the diners. Ramsay then assigned Barret and Jessica to waitstaff for service, but both struggled with poor handwriting. In the men's kitchen, though Anthony put in a strong performance on meat, Ray and Dan were unable to work together on fish as Ray declined Dan's help, but overcooked halibut and scallops. In the women's kitchen, Amanda and Susan had communication issues on appetizers, and Mary and Nedra served raw pork and then Nedra lied to Ramsay that she had another one coming, but then revealed that she was six minutes away on it. After Ray served raw halibut and Nedra served raw pork, Ramsay threw both teams out of their kitchens and had the sous chefs finish service. Sous Chef James came into the men's dorm with the raw halibut, berating them and threatening to quit. In addition, Ramsay stopped both teams in the stairwell, where he ordered them to nominate two chefs for elimination. Elimination: The women nominated Mary and Nedra while the men nominated Dan and Ray. Ramsay had the four remove their jackets, and promised to do something he had never done before on Hell's Kitchen as the episode ended in a cliffhanger.
151	7	"15 Chefs Compete"	April 16, 2013	4.77
In the recap, Jeremy's jacket was hung and his picture was burned. Elimination – continued: Ramsay put Dan, Mary, Nedra and Ray on probation and kept their jackets. He stated they would have to individually accomplish a task by the end of the next dinner service that was worth earning their jackets back, or they would be eliminated. Team challenge: The chefs had three minutes to select five ingredients for each of the six Chinese dishes that each team would make; the ingredients were chosen by opening colorful, oversized fortune cookies with chopsticks. Since the women had an extra member, Mary and Cyndi worked together. Each team then had 40 minutes to create the dishes. Judging the challenge was Chef Martin Yan. Jacqueline scored over Dan on fried rice, Jon scored over Jessica on stir fry, Barret scored over Nedra on spring rolls, Mary and Cyndi scored over Ray on dumplings, and both Ja'Nel and Michael scored on soup. Finally, Anthony scored over Susan on chow-mien, giving the men their first challenge victory, 4-3. In addition, Ray and Dan earned their jackets back, as both had good-tasting dishes, despite not earning points for their team. Reward/punishment: The men participated in a paintball match against each other, during which everyone aimed for Dan. The women made potstickers and dumplings from scratch for the next service, and had balut eggs for lunch. Service: Ramsay announced the VIP guests at the chef's tables with actor Rex Lee in the men's kitchen and director Adam Shankman in the women's kitchen. Ja'Nel and Ray served dim sum appetizers tableside, but Ray was slow, forcing Anthony and Jon to refire a risotto. Nedra and Mary earned their jackets back for their strong performance on appetizers, but both teams had trouble on entrées. Despite Dan's strong performance on meat, Barret served raw shrimp to the chef's table and accidentally left parchment paper on fish, while Jessica repeatedly overcooked and undercooked fish and Susan constantly got her times wrong on meat, undercooking a lamb and then accidentally dropping it on the refire. Both teams successfully completed service, but Ramsay named both teams losers. Elimination: The women nominated Jessica and Susan while the men nominated Dan (despite having a much better service than Barret) and Ray. Ramsay sent Dan back in line and eliminated Jessica for her disintegrating performances after her strong start and lack of fightback. Jessica's comment: "During this experience, I tried to stay very confident and very strong, and that came across as not passionate, and that sucks. I guess I just didn't put up enough fight for Chef Ramsay to believe in me." Ramsay's comment: "When Jessica first arrived, I had high expectations for her. Unfortunately, she let us both down."
152	8	"14 Chefs Compete"	April 23, 2013	4.83
Team challenge: The chefs had 10 minutes to herd various farm animals, representing a protein, into pens marked with the names of starches, creating a protein/starch combo that they were told to cook in 45 minutes for judging by Jon Shook, the head chef at Animal. Ramsay announced that only five dishes from each team would be judged; the women chose to drop Cyndi and Jacqueline while the men chose to drop Jon and Dan. Nedra scored over Ray on turkey, Susan scored over Anthony on duck, Zach scored over Mary on lamb and Barret scored over Amanda on pork. The women won 3–2 after Ja'Nel scored on goat over Michael, whose goat dish was selected by the men over Dan's. Shook and Ramsay tasted Dan's dish and agreed it was superior to Michael's. Reward/punishment: The women spent the day at the Aquarium of the Pacific, feeding penguins and snorkeling with sea creatures. The men had to set up a petting zoo and prep both kitchens for family night. During the punishment, Dan got grumpy at his team for dropping his dish, and walked out on them after Barret mocked him relentlessly. Service: Ramsay announced that his family would be in attendance, as well as Sous Chef James' family. Also in attendance that night was Gretchen Rossi. Both kitchens had a decent run on appetizers, though Dan burnt and under-seasoned pizza, while Jacqueline burnt scallops. The women, however, were almost flawless on entrées, mostly thanks to Mary on meat. In the men's kitchen, Ray undercooked a burger for Ramsay's son, Jack, but recovered, while Barret made numerous mistakes on meat, serving lamb he knew was raw and undercooking chicken for Sous Chef James's pregnant wife, the latter of which prompted Ramsay to order the women to take over for the men, who helped the men finish service under Mary's leadership. The women were deemed the clear winners, with Mary being named the best performer of the night, while the men were told once again to nominate two chefs for elimination. Elimination: Barret and Dan were nominated. Much to the men's relief, Ramsay eliminated Dan for his bad attitude, arrogance, and lack of teamwork. Ramsay also warned the men that he would send more than one chef home if they did not improve in the next dinner service. Dan's comment: "Barret, you are a weapons-grade douchebag. Zach, you're two-faced as shit. Michael, you are S-T-O-O-P-I-D, stupid. My message to the blue team is, shove it up your ass." Ramsay's comment: "Dan was just too much of a wild card. There's no way I'm betting a restaurant in Vegas on him."
153	9	"13 Chefs Compete"	April 30, 2013	4.79
Team challenge: The chefs were each given a cut of steak, and were challenged to cook it to medium rare and serve it with a spice rub and/or sauce of their own making. Since the women had an extra member, Nedra and Susan were told to work as a team. Jon scored over Cyndi on porterhouse steak, both Zach and Nedra and Susan earned a point on filet steak, neither Amanda or Michael earned a point on New York strip, both Anthony and Jacqueline earned a point on ribcap, and Ja'Nel scored over Barret on hanger steak. Lastly, Mary scored over Ray on ribeye, giving the women a 4–3 win. Reward/punishment: The women were rewarded with a poolside lunch and spa treatments on the roof of the Kimpton Hotel Wilshire. The men had to prep both kitchens and the steak for the next service, in which the theme was steak night. Service: Zach and Susan served tableside prime rib. The men got off to a strong start with Jon and Anthony on appetizers, despite Barret initially cooking crab cakes not on order and then being slow bringing up the salad for them. Ray then undercooked steaks, resulting in Michael taking over, but the men completed service smoothly afterwards. In the women's kitchen, Mary forgot an order of sliders and then accidentally left hair in an order served. The team managed to serve appetizers, but on entrées, Jacqueline and Amanda were caught waiting for Susan to serve the prime rib before starting their steaks, even though all the steaks needed to be at the table at the same time. They then repeatedly served raw filets, and Nedra's attempt to help proved ineffectual. This resulted in Ramsay ejecting the trio, plus a very confused Cyndi (who hadn't messed anything up), after which he called Susan into the kitchen to help Ja'Nel and Mary complete service. Ramsay named the men clear winners. Elimination: Amanda and Jacqueline were nominated. Ramsay sent Amanda back in line and eliminated Jacqueline for her lackadaisical attitude and consistently mediocre performances. Jacqueline's comment: "I think Chef Ramsay made a huge mistake. I'm extremely proud of myself in everything that I do, and I don't need some guy that screams at me to tell me that I'm a good chef. I'm gonna keep going on, I'm gonna keep cooking, and that's what I want to do with my life, and I love it." Ramsay's comment: "Jacqueline talked a good game, but unfortunately for her, I need someone who can deliver."
154	10	"12 Chefs Compete"	May 7, 2013	4.71
Team challenge: To mark Hell's Kitchen's first quinceañera service, each team made a five course tasting menu, based on the suggestions of Breanna, the girl celebrating her quinceañera, along with her mother Jennifer and godmother Josette. Jon scored over Ja'Nel on cold appetizers, Cyndi scored over Barret on hot appetizers, Ray scored over Nedra on the pasta entree, Mary scored over Anthony on the chicken entree and Amanda scored over Michael on the meat entree, giving the women a 3–2 win, their seventh challenge win out of eight. Reward/punishment: The women spent the day at Knott's Berry Farm. The men decorated Hell's Kitchen for the quinceañera under the supervision of Josette, who was the event's party planner. Service: Ramsay stated that after appetizers, Breanna would perform a traditional waltz, so appetizers needed to be finished on time in both kitchens. Both kitchens worked together to serve Breanna's 13-guest table, however, the women were held up by Amanda improperly cutting the tuna. Despite that, they managed to get Breanna's table appetizers out on time. The men's appetizer stage went almost flawlessly, thanks to Jon and Anthony, and they finished well before the women, who once again were held up by Amanda's struggles on appetizers, while Nedra only made it worse by confusing Amanda with unwanted help. After an undercooked tuna went to the pass, Amanda and Nedra argued over who was responsible for it, completely stalling appetizers. When Nedra dropped tuna on the floor and a fire erupted on the appetizer station, Josette and Jean-Philippe were forced to begin the waltz with two unfinished tables of appetizers in the women's kitchen. The entrée stage didn't fare much better for the women, with Nedra overcooking chicken and Cyndi serving raw rib eye. The men struggled as well; Zach repeatedly served less potatoes than needed and talked back to Ramsay about it, and Barret served undercooked and oily linguine and left a splinter in a burnt kebab. Ramsay named both teams losers, calling the women a "disaster" and the men "embarrassing". Elimination: The men nominated Barret and Zach while the women nominated Amanda and Cyndi. Ramsay eliminated Amanda for her second consecutive awful performance, getting overwhelmed too easily, and lack of confidence. However, Ramsay then stated that he was not finished, leaving the fates of Cyndi, Barret and Zach uncertain. Amanda's comment: "I didn't expect to be leaving Hell's Kitchen so soon. This is something I've been doing for 13 years. I thought it was easy, and it's not. It's not easy. I'll tell you that, it's not easy."
155	11	"10 Chefs Compete"	May 13, 2013	4.19
In the recap, Amanda's jacket was hung and her picture was burned. Elimination – continued: Following Amanda's elimination, Ramsay sent Cyndi back in line and gave Zach and Barret 10 seconds to plead their cases. He then eliminated Barret for his fourth consecutive poor service performance. This marked the first time in Hell's Kitchen history that two people were eliminated on the same night as a result of the traditional elimination process. Ramsay gave no comment on Amanda and Barret's eliminations. Barret's comment: "I don't agree with the decision, but I really can't be upset with myself, because I did everything I possibly could. I think I could've made it further, but I didn't do it quick enough for Chef." Team challenge: A representative from each team (Susan and Anthony) had 30 seconds to collect as many slips of paper as they could while in a wind chamber. Then, each team had 45 minutes to cook five dishes based on those ingredients, in which they were judged on taste, texture, and aesthetic appeal. From each team, Ramsay chose three of the five dishes based on looks alone, choosing Ja'Nel, Mary, Cyndi, Jon, Anthony, and Zach. The dishes were then scored by Ramsay and the editor of People magazine, Jennifer Garcia, out of 50; the team with the most points would win. For the men, Jon scored 92, Anthony scored 82, and Zach scored 83. For the women, Ja'Nel scored 89, and Cyndi and Mary both scored 90, giving them a 269–257 win. Ramsay noted that Jon had the highest scoring dish of the day but lost out due to Zach and Anthony's subpar dishes. Reward/punishment: The women were each rewarded with a Vitamix blender and joined Ramsay in a photo shoot for People magazine, where Mary's dish from the challenge was showcased. The men had to clean the dorms, during which Jon and Zach were called to deliver champagne to the women by tricycle. Service: Ramsay called both teams to his office to inform them that returning U.S. Army servicemen would be dining that night in a special private service. Two twelve-tops were set, in which a team of wait staff would serve each course simultaneously. For the poached prawn course, the men got off to a good start under Jon, despite Ray having some trouble cooking the tea noodles for the course, while Ja'nel initially struggled to give a time for the course before Ramsay warned her to be more vocal. However, the men hit numerous problems on the lobster linguine. Ray struggled delegating tasks to his team, and then attempted to plate by himself. After Zach improperly portioned the pasta when plating, Ray angrily kicked him off the course. Even worse, one of the men's linguine dishes was sent back for being undercooked. The refire got further backed up when Zach decided to sabotage Ray by serving lobster cooked in cold sauce, eventually delaying it until after the fourth course had already been completed. Nedra also backed up her linguine course by pouring cold water into the already boiling pasta water, but the course was completed successfully with Cyndi's help. Mary and Michael had no trouble with the risotto course, while Cyndi and Anthony also had no trouble with their loup de mer course. On the New York striploin course, Susan failed to time her steaks properly and had to keep pushing back the men's course as a result. She also sliced the steaks before the team had started dressing any of the plates, earning a warning from Ramsay. Zach did not communicate with Jon over the sauce. He also failed to season of the steaks after slicing them, and Ramsay angrily rebuked him for attempting to lie that they had. Both teams completed service, but Ramsay was angry that both teams performed poorly and declared no winner, telling each team to nominate one chef for elimination. Elimination: The women nominated Nedra and the men nominated Ray. When Jon acknowledged to Ramsay that Zach had performed just as poorly as Ray, Ramsay called Nedra, Ray and Zach forward. After hearing each of their pleas, Ramsay sent Nedra back in line and then eliminated Ray for his lack of leadership and inconsistent performances, but Ramsay expressed his respect for him coming into the competition. Ray's comment: "Tonight is a disappointment, and it eats me up. I'm leaving with my integrity, I'm leaving with my pride, and I'm leaving knowing that I was a gentleman. I may have been the oldest competitor ever to be on Hell's Kitchen, but I'll tell you, I think I gave it a hell of a run." Ramsay's comment: "Ray's age wasn't the issue, it was his cooking. And I wasn't getting any younger waiting for him to improve."
156	12	"9 Chefs Compete"	May 13, 2013	3.89
Pre-service: For the second time this season, there was no team challenge. Instead, Ramsay asked the teams to spend the day creating their own menu for service. The men did this easily, despite Zach barely participating at first. The women, however, had trouble as Nedra kept making suggestions that the other women hated, but they finally let her put a gumbo on the menu. Ramsay liked the men's menu, but hated the women's (except for Nedra's gumbo), requiring numerous last minute changes before service. Service: Guests in attendance for this service were Ian Ziering, LisaRaye McCoy, Tim Nordwind of OK Go, and Nikki Soohoo. The women started slow with Nedra's slow performance on appetizers, and was called out by both Ramsay and Susan for not giving Cyndi anything to do. On entrees, both Cyndi and Susan sent up raw branzino and watery mushrooms respectively, but both recovered and the women had a strong finish. While the men started off strong on appetizers, they faltered on entrees. Zach served perfect pork on the first order after being berated for cooking it not to order, but he did not inform Anthony to prepare sauce for the filet, resulting in the latter serving cold sauce. Things soon got worse when Michael undercooked and overcooked halibut, leading Ramsay to send him to the bar for a time out, during which Zach served raw pork. While both teams completed service, the women were named clear winners. Elimination: While the men had to nominate one chef for elimination, Ramsay called the women to his office and told them to nominate one member willing to join the men. The men failed to decide between Michael and Zach (Jon and Zach chose Michael while Michael and Anthony chose Zach), so Ramsay called them both down. Ramsay eliminated Michael for being the worst performer of the night. Ramsay then asked the women for their nominee to go over, but Ja'Nel announced they all wanted to go and had a lottery to decide who would, and drew Cyndi's name, angering Ramsay, and the episode ended in a cliffhanger. Michael's comment: "I had one bad service. My team saw me as a threat, that's why they got me out of there. I tried to put up a good fight, but Chef Ramsay saw otherwise, so, you know, I have to respect his decision."
157	13	"8 Chefs Compete"	May 23, 2013	5.62
In the recap, Michael's jacket was hung and his picture was burned. Team change: Ramsay ordered the women to discuss amongst themselves on who should join the men. Cyndi and Susan were both shocked that Zach had not been eliminated and withdrew their interest, ultimately leading to Nedra volunteering. Team challenge: A chef was paired up with a member from the opposite team to spin a wheel to decide which style of ethnic dish they should cook in 45 minutes alongside a protein of their choice. Each dish would then be judged by Ramsay and the editor of Every Day with Rachael Ray magazine, Dana Bowen. Jon scored over Mary on Indian, but Ja'Nel scored over Nedra on Thai. Cyndi then scored over Anthony on Greek and Susan scored over Zach on Japanese, resulting in the red team winning their fifth consecutive challenge, 3-1. Reward/punishment: The red team were each given $500 for a shopping spree at Kitson, and had lunch at Mr. Chow. In addition, each chef received a set of copper-clad cookware. The blue team had to take in a delivery of wine, clean the stemware, slice 40 pounds each of lemons and limes, and prep both kitchens for service. Service: Amongst the red team's diners for this service was Kelly Hu. The blue team failed to serve any entrées. Nedra was very slow on appetizers while her station was disorganized, causing her to serve a risotto that was too salty, and she only made it worse by shoving Zach and Anthony aside when they tried to help her. This prompted Ramsay and Jon to threaten to kick her off the station if she continued to struggle. However, after Jon undercooked scallops twice, Ramsay threw the blue team out. In the red kitchen, Susan cooked four orders of risotto when only two were required, and Ja'Nel undercooked scallops. Ramsay threw out the red team as well after Ja'Nel undercooked halibut for Hu's table and chewed out Cyndi for muttering "fuck me" under her breath. He then had Jean-Philippe apologized to the diners, saying the service was the worst ever in Hell's Kitchen history, shut the restaurant down and stopped both teams in the stairwell, wondering if he had sent the wrong chefs home, and ordered them to each nominate one chef for elimination. Elimination: The red team nominated Susan and the blue team nominated Nedra. Ramsay was surprised that Susan was nominated instead of Ja'Nel, while Nedra fought against her nomination and angrily accused Zach and Anthony of sabotaging her station that night. Despite this, Ramsay called both Susan and Nedra down and then eliminated Nedra for her declining performances and constantly blaming her teammates for her mistakes. Nedra was paid a retrospective montage during her exit. Nedra's comment: "Hell's Kitchen is a roller coaster ride. You go from being nervous, to mad, to being happy, and mentally, it's crazy. I made a couple mistakes. But nobody can say, 'Oh, she didn't fight.' All my life, I had to fight. Even coming here, I had to fight to come here, so I'm not gonna let one thing defeat me." Ramsay's comment: "Nedra wore a red jacket and a blue jacket. But after tonight's performance, I knew that she wouldn't be wearing a black jacket."
158	14	"7 Chefs Compete Part 1"	May 30, 2013	5.22
Following Nedra's elimination, the battle of the sexes was re-ignited. Team challenge: The chefs were tested on their ability to determine food by touch. Anthony and Cyndi volunteered with Anthony winning the challenge 3–2. Ramsay then revealed the real challenge was the blind taste test. With the men down a member, they were asked to choose one chef to go twice, which was Zach. Zach identified three ingredients compared to Mary's one, Ja'Nel scored three while Anthony scored zero, Jon and Cyndi both scored two, and Susan and Zach both scored one, giving the women a 7–6 win, marking the women's tenth challenge win out of eleven, giving them the best challenge record in Hell's Kitchen history. This also marked the first time in Hell's Kitchen history that one team won six consecutive challenges. Reward/punishment: The women were rewarded with a seafood lunch at the Nobu restaurant in Malibu, followed by horseback riding in the Santa Monica Mountains. The men had to take in deliveries of flour, ice, and bread and prep both kitchens for dinner service. Anthony misread the ice delivery invoice, which forced the men to take in more deliveries than needed, angering Jon and Zach. Surprise immunity challenge: Before service began, Ramsay revealed the season's first individual challenge, in which each chef would be competing to earn immunity from elimination in the dinner service. The chefs had 45 minutes to prepare a dish of their choice. Each chef had a chance to earn a seat in the immunity chair, while the others had to beat them out. Ja'Nel was the first to sit in the "immunity chair", beating out Anthony and Susan, but Jon took her place, beating out Mary and Zach. Last up was Cyndi, however, before Ramsay announced his decision, the episode ended in a cliffhanger.
159	15	"7 Chefs Compete Part 2"	June 6, 2013	5.28
Surprise immunity challenge – continued: Ramsay decided to give Jon the immunity, ensuring him safe from elimination. Service: Ramsay announced the chef's tables for this service with Maria Menounos in the men's kitchen and Jeremy Sisto in the women's kitchen. In addition, Jim O'Heir was also in attendance. In the men's kitchen, Jon served a bland risotto, while Anthony took scallops out of the pan individually instead of all at once, gave the wrong number of lobster tails for Jon's risotto, and then overcooked them. Anthony served fish before Zach's meat was ready, and Ramsay accused Zach of holding back his team. He was later sent to storeroom after undercooking halibut. Zach undercooked wellingtons repeatedly and eventually ran out, forcing Ramsay to use Susan's wellingtons to fulfill the order. Ramsay kicked Zach off the station after Zach forgot the order for the VIP table and overcooked lamb. In the women's kitchen, Cyndi produced too little risotto, had a messy station and did not call out orders to the other chefs despite producing good food, while Ja'Nel had to see a medic after cutting her finger, and sent poor mushrooms but recovered. However, Susan had a strong performance on meat, serving perfect lamb (in contrast to serving raw lamb in the signature dish, raw lamb in the season's second dinner service, and raw lamb at the immunity challenge), as well as wellingtons. Ramsay named the women clear winners and asked Jon to nominate either Anthony or Zach for elimination, and the women for one volunteer to join the men. Elimination: Jon nominated Anthony but Ramsay still needed to hear from both Anthony and Zach. Anthony was eliminated for he has been on a serious downward spiral and lack of confidence over the past several services, but Ramsay gave him encouragement. Anthony's comment: "Hell's Kitchen is insane. It's like no other kitchen I've ever heard about, worked in, or seen in my entire life. The blue team really couldn't get it together this whole competition. There was a bad cloud hanging over us this whole time, and I'm the most recent victim." Team change: The women agreed to transfer Ja'Nel to the men, as she was the only one who was willing to work with Zach. Ramsay remarked that he hoped she would not follow in Nedra's footsteps. Ramsay's comment: "Anthony hobbled through Hell's Kitchen, and even though his leg eventually got better, his cooking didn't."
160	16	"6 Chefs Compete"	June 13, 2013	5.14
For the second time in three years, Ramsay chose not to merge the final six into a united black team. Team challenge: The final team challenge was the communication challenge. The chefs had to prepare three dishes from the regular Hell's Kitchen menu: chicken, halibut, and rack of lamb. Only one chef from each team was allowed in the kitchen at a time, for only five minutes. When their time was up, the next chef took his or her place, with the previous chef having 15 seconds to brief them. Ramsay then compared the same dishes from each team for completeness, taste, and appearance. Neither team scored on lamb as the blue team's was raw and the red team had terrible presentation, but the blue team scored on the other two (Mary failed to plate the chicken on time, later revealed to be dry and overcooked, while Cyndi overseared the halibut on one side and it tasted burnt) to win their second challenge 2–0, ending their six challenge losing streak. Reward/punishment: The blue team went on a helicopter tour of Los Angeles and visited the Gillette Ranch in the Santa Monica Mountains to sample rare caviar. The red team had to unload a truck of potatoes and onions to prepare meals for the Los Angeles Mission and prep both kitchens for service. During the punishment, Cyndi suffered an asthma attack, but was able to continue after receiving treatment. Service: In the blue kitchen, Jon and Ja'Nel served perfect appetizers and scallops on appetizers, but Zach was caught scorching some of his lamb and miscommunicated to Ramsay how many wellingtons were on order. Zach struggled to communicate at times and served overcooked lamb, but he recovered and the blue kitchen successfully completed service. In the red kitchen, Susan prepared perfect risotto, but Cyndi started preparing entrées before all appetizers were served and served overcooked lobster tails on the last table of appetizers. Mary attempted to help, but she served raw lobster tails, so Ramsay took the team to the storeroom and told them to get a grip. The red team had no problems on entrees and successfully completed service. Ramsay named both teams winners, but had them each nominate one chef for elimination. Elimination: The blue team nominated Zach and the red team nominated Cyndi. However, Ramsay questioned Cyndi's nomination. After explaining again he wanted the weakest chef nominated; Cyndi nominated Mary, Mary nominated Susan, and Susan nominated Cyndi. After asking Ja'Nel, Ramsay called Susan down but eliminated Zach, deciding he had been given too many chances and was not fulfilling his expectations. Zach's comment: "I got to work side-by-side with one of the greatest chefs of our time, so I'm gonna still continue my culinary dream, and, hopefully, if Chef Ramsay needs me in the future, he'll pick the phone up and call me. If he calls, I'll be there. Not a problem." Ramsay's comment: "There once was a chef named Zach. For words he didn't lack. But in the kitchen, he was no magician, and he won't be coming back."
161	17	"5 Chefs Compete Part 1"	June 20, 2013	5.19
Before the first individual challenge, the remaining chefs were shown a video from Ramsay that showed each of the chef's families wishing them luck. Ramsay then added that the chefs would face one more challenge and unveiled a curtain which actually had the family members in the restaurant (Susan's mother and brother, Ja'Nel's mother and sister, Jon's mother and sister, Cyndi's mother and sister and Mary's mother and brother). After each chef spent time with their loved ones, Ramsay gave the five remaining chefs black jackets. Challenge: Each chef had 45 minutes to use a pressure cooker to prepare a dish using one of five cheap cuts of meat, each hidden in a pressure cooker, and fashion the dish as a five-star entrée. Ramsay judged the dishes alongside James Beard award-winner and owner of Osteria Mozza, Nancy Silverton, and Los Angeles magazine's Dine editor Leslie Barger Suter, the first person to receive the James Beard award for culinary journalism. Each judge rated the dish from 1–5; the chef with the most stars wins. Mary won with a perfect score of 15 (she was the only chef who had experience using a pressure cooker), Ja'Nel came in second with 14, Jon third with 10, Susan fourth with 9, and Cyndi last with 7. Reward/punishment: Mary and her family had lunch at Wolfgang Puck's restaurant WP24 atop the Ritz-Carlton Hotel in downtown Los Angeles. The others had to work maintenance for Tree People at Coldwater Canyon before sorting out recyclables and organics for recycling day back at Hell's Kitchen. Pre-service: Ramsay called the chefs down to the kitchen to remind them that would be the most challenging service yet forthcoming because they will all work as one single team. Ramsay then announced that they would be competing against a team of five chefs that he has worked with before and proclaimed they are some of the best he has worked with as the episode ended in a cliffhanger.
162	18	"5 Chefs Compete Part 2"	June 27, 2013	5.54
Pre-service – continued: The five chefs competing against the black team are revealed to be past winners of Hell's Kitchen. They include Rahman "Rock" Harper from season 3, Christina Machamer from season 4, Dave Levey from season 6, Nona Sivley from season 8 and Paul Niedermann from season 9. Both teams had to come up with signature dishes to add to the menu. Ramsay also left it up to the teams to decide who would be on each station. Both teams had difficulty deciding on food, with Susan wanting the menu to be simple, and Nona wanting an exclusively southern-themed menu. On the black team, Susan was made to float, Cyndi took the meat station, Jon on fish, Mary on garnish and Ja'Nel on hot appetizers. The returning team had few issues preparing their dishes while the current chefs had issues with their duck confit, having to serve their dish without it. Ramsay felt that their steak tartare was underseasoned and that failing to serve the confit was unacceptable, ordering the returning team to recook both dishes from scratch. On presenting again however, Ramsay approved them. The returning chefs presented a rendered duck breast with toasted pistachios and veal lamb chop with collard greens and ham-hock for their entrée. Service: Service started strong with Jon and Mary cooking perfect scallops, while Nona forgot Ramsay's recipe for risotto and underportioned them. Dave jumped in to help her, and while Nona initially refused the help, the two quickly served appetizers. Susan and Ja'Nel generally did a good job on appetizers, though Ja'Nel refused to help Susan with large amount of tartare orders, as she was cooking the risotto, but Mary helped Susan and successfully got appetizers out. Susan also struggled timing her capellini on the last table of appetizers, but she managed to successfully cook it and get it to the pass on time. Christina and Paul both generally did well on fish and meat, though Paul was twice called out for serving undercooked meat, while Rock attempted to lead the kitchen but confused them more than anything. Cyndi had issues with timing on lamb, and though the black team almost finished first, a lamb being returned stalled them until after the returning winners had finished theirs. The winner was decided by comment cards; the returning team received a score of 95% customer satisfaction, while the black team narrowly lost, scoring 93%. Elimination: Susan and Cyndi were nominated. Ramsay ultimately spared the entire final five, as a reprieve for almost matching the five returning champions. However, he warned them that the next day, one, two, or even three of them could be eliminated.
163	19	"5 Chefs Compete Part 3"	July 11, 2013	5.25
Challenge: The chefs had to create ten gourmet burgers, which would then be judged by Ramsay and Jean-Phillippe along with people associated with some of the finest restaurants in the country, including Darren Kim of Nobu, Marino Monferrato of Ceconni's (who would become maitre d' of Hell's Kitchen two seasons later), and David Rosoff and Joseph Bastianich of Osteria Mozza. Susan's "Healthy Burger" was named the worst, while almost 40% of the diners named Jon's "Roman Burger" the best. Reward/punishment: Jon was rewarded with a spa day at Dtox Day Spa, and chose Cyndi to join him. The others had to do chores listed by Jean-Philippe, including ironing the tablecloths, polishing the silverware, and washing his car. They also had to prep the kitchen for dinner service. Service: Antonio Sabàto, Jr. and his friend showed up without a reservation and were given a position at the chef's table, at the request of Ramsay. Alex Tagliani, and Challen Cates were also in attendance. Ja'Nel served properly cooked risotto to the chef's table, as did Cyndi with lobster for the risotto and Mary on sliders. However, Ja'Nel overcooked an order of risotto but quickly recovered, while Mary forgot a patty for one of the sliders and then overcooked the refire. With Susan's help, the sliders were served, but Susan then burnt garnish while Mary burned one side of a sole whilst boiling the other side, though both recovered. Susan then tried preparing entrées for a ticket before the appetizers for that ticket were served, causing Ramsay to leave the kitchen with sous chef Andi, which marked the 3rd time in show history that Ramsay left the kitchen during service, leaving Susan to run the pass. Ramsay then returned to the kitchen and the chefs eventually complete service. However, Ramsay called the service "dreadful" and said they "had better services than that weeks ago", ordering them to nominate two for elimination. Elimination: The team nominated Mary, but could not choose between Ja'Nel and Susan, so Ramsay called down all three of them. Ramsay sent Mary back in line and eliminated Susan for her worsening performances in the past three services, but gave her encouragement, stating that he would maybe have a job for her in the future. Susan's comment: "Coming into the competition, I realized that there was gonna be people that were much more experienced than me. I'm in culinary school, and this was my very first experience working on a line. I'm most proud that no matter what challenge was thrown at me, I did not back down. I had a black jacket. You know, I made it very far in this competition, so I'm gonna be ready for whatever comes my way." Ramsay's comment: "Susan had little experience, but she came a long way. She's not ready to lead my kitchen in Vegas, but I'm happy to say that she'll be leaving Hell's Kitchen as a real chef."
164	20	"4 Chefs Compete"	July 18, 2013	4.90
Challenge: The chefs were split into teams of Ja'Nel and Cyndi and Jon and Mary. Each team then had to put together a puzzle which had an image of a dish. Ramsay then revealed the real challenge was the "Taste it, now make it" challenge, in which the chefs had 30 minutes to replicate the sample dish, using taste, touch and sight alone to make it, determine the protein, the sauce and all other components. Mary chose bison, but halfway into cooking, switched to lamb, leading to it being undercooked, while Cyndi and Ja'Nel chose venison and Jon chose beef. All four decided on butternut squash for the sauce. Ja'Nel and Jon chose parsnip for their vegetable, Cyndi chose turnip and Mary chose celery root. Ramsay told the chefs that the correct protein was venison, eliminating both Jon and Mary. All four were incorrect in choosing butternut squash as the puree, as it was carrot, but Cyndi won the challenge as turnip was the correct vegetable. Reward/punishment: Cyndi was rewarded with a $1,000 shopping spree with Jean-Philippe at Sur La Table, followed by lunch with Ramsay at his newest Los Angeles restaurant, The Fat Cow at The Grove at Farmers Market. The others had to load all the furniture not being used in the dorms into a moving truck and also prepare the kitchen for that night's service. Service: Each of the chefs took turns running the pass and had to spot acts of sabotage that Ramsay and sous chef Andi deliberately set up. Cyndi was the first chef to take on the pass; she led well despite the other chefs not responding to her initial call, but failed to spot crab in a risotto instead of lobster. Ja'Nel led well despite little respect from the other chefs and spotted cod being served instead of halibut, while also sending back two capellini from Cyndi because they were underseasoned. Jon accidentally read off a ticket requesting a wellington with no pork (this was not possible, as the prosciutto was added to the wellington during prep). Due to his communication struggles, Ja'Nel undercooked lamb while Mary burned garnish. He also didn't notice Andi using butterfish instead of scallops. Lastly, Mary led well with her assertiveness, sending back Jon's rubbery scallops and Cyndi's cold risotto, and spotted a lamb wellington instead of beef. Elimination: Ramsay asked the four to explain why they deserved to stay. He then eliminated Cyndi, feeling she was not yet ready for the job awaiting in Vegas, but urged her not to give up on her culinary career. Then, Ramsay announced Mary as the first chef in the final. As Ramsay was about to name the other finalist, the episode ended in a cliffhanger. Cyndi's comment: "I really came into the competition with a lack of confidence. Even though I got beat up and knocked down, I didn't give up. I didn't falter under pressure. I was able to rise above and give everything – my whole heart, my whole soul. Winning all the challenges and winning dinner service was great. I know that I gave everything that I had throughout this competition. I came here not knowing if I was a chef, and I'm leaving here knowing that I'm absolutely a chef."
165	21	"2 Chefs Compete"	July 25, 2013	5.29
Elimination – continued: Ramsay announced Ja'Nel as the second finalist, eliminating Jon. Ramsay praised Jon for his performance and told him that he would be leaving as his lone shining star from this year's men's team (which Ramsay otherwise deemed to have been the worst ever team in Hell's Kitchen), and told him to stay in touch because he may have a job for him in the future. He allowed Jon to keep his jacket, making him the first male chef to be allowed to keep his jacket upon departure. Ramsay gave no comment on Cyndi and Jon's eliminations. Jon's comment: "It sucks not to be in the final pairing, but it was a hell of a ride. And being on the blue team was hard. Every punishment, every time I won and still lost, you know, knocked me down a little bit. And I just got back up. I have nothing to be ashamed of. I guess in the end, even I couldn't survive the curse of the blue team. Damn, it would've felt good to be in that last two, though." Ja'Nel and Mary flew via private jet to Las Vegas where they received their own suite at Caesars Palace. They then planned out four appetizers, four entrées and two desserts with help from Sous Chefs James and Andi for their service before meeting Gary Selesner, President of Caesars Palace, and Hell's Kitchen season 10 winner Christina Wilson at Gordon Ramsay Steak. They were then given chef's jackets for the upcoming service. After returning to Hell's Kitchen, the women then received a call from Ramsay to join him at Union Station. Upon arrival, they met him and their families. Ja'Nel and Mary then walked through a curtain, only to find themselves in front of a large audience. Challenge: Ja'Nel and Mary had to prepare two appetizers and three entrées to present to a panel of esteemed judges. Ja'Nel won 3–2. Reward: Ja'Nel was granted first pick in drafting a team using the ten chefs eliminated from the competition prior to the final. (Note: Barret did not return; Jacqueline, as the last chef eliminated prior to the top twelve, was slated to take his place, but also did not return. Therefore, Dan, as the last chef eliminated prior to the top thirteen, took Barret's place.) Ja'Nel picked Cyndi, Susan, Zach, Amanda and Ray, while Mary picked Jon, Anthony, Nedra and Michael, and was left with Dan. Pre-service: Before heading back to Hell's Kitchen, Ja'Nel and Mary were given envelopes with instructions not to open them until they returned to Hell's Kitchen. Ja'Nel and Mary were given the opportunity to trade a team member before the start of service, but Ja'Nel told Mary she was happy with her team when Mary said she wanted to trade Dan for Cyndi. Mary's team liked her menu, but Zach, Cyndi, and Susan irritated Ja'Nel by openly questioning her menu choices. Ja'Nel told the team she planned to speak to Mary before the episode ended in a cliffhanger.
166	22	"Winner Chosen"	July 25, 2013	5.61
Pre-service – continued: Ja'Nel decided to keep her team and told her team she wanted the menu to represent her. During prep, Dan worked slowly, asked many elementary questions, and showed Mary no respect before walking out for a smoke break, prompting her to warn the entire team that she would watch them all very closely and not hesitate to kick people out. Service: Ramsay then informed the chefs that, for the first time in Hell's Kitchen history, the final service would include two chef's tables. In Ja'Nel's kitchen is Anthony Anderson and his son, and in Mary's kitchen is Kat Graham and Tony Hawk. Also among the diners for service were talk show host Leeza Gibbons, actor John Schneider and former Olympic diver Greg Louganis in addition to the finalists' family members. In Ja'Nel's kitchen, Ray underdressed salads and Susan burned flatbread that was supposed go with Cyndi's mussels, but thanks to Amanda, they served appetizers. In Mary's kitchen, Nedra sent bland salad and risotto along with cold short ribs, while being slow to get orders to the pass, though she recovered after Mary threatened to kick her out. Mary unknowingly called for one portion of scallops when two were on order, briefly confusing Jon until Michael caught the mistake. On entrees, Dan struggled on meat, serving rare New York strip twice. After prompting by Mary, Dan again served it rare, causing Mary to kick him out. Mary is the first finalist in Hell's Kitchen history to throw a cook out of the kitchen during service. Nedra took over, and though Dan overcooked almost all the steaks, she found one that was properly cooked. Meanwhile, Susan served cold potatoes and Zach failed to communicate from the meat station, though both recovered. After Ja'Nel's kitchen slowed down considerably, she took control and got her team to rally back, finishing just after Mary. Winner: After deliberating, Ramsay brought Ja'Nel and Mary to his office and gave them final praise before sending them in front of a door each. Ja'Nel's door opened, making her the eleventh winner of Hell's Kitchen. Ja'Nel hung her portrait on the Wall of Fame, while Dan apologized to Mary for his performance and reconciled with her. Mary's comment: "It's just hard. I wish that I could sit here and cry tears of joy, but it's just not how it is. It's just a hard pill to swallow. This has been the most amazing ride of my life. Even though I didn't win, like, I'm still a winner, and Hell's Kitchen has completely transformed who I am as a chef. It's 'Bye-bye, Mary the butcher' and 'Hello, Mary the chef.'" Ja'Nel's comment: "Oh, my God! I win! I win Hell's Kitchen Season 11! I feel on top of the world. I cannot believe it. How lucky can I be? I will never forget this day for the rest of my life. I'm so proud of myself right now. It's been a wild, wild ride, but it's been incredible, and my life will never, ever be the same. My Hell's Kitchen journey ends tonight, but my future lies at Caesars Palace: Gordon Ramsay's Pub & Grill. I am so ready to move to Vegas, dig my heels in, and get to work." Ramsay's comment: "In all my years in Hell's Kitchen, I have never seen a more composed individual than Ja'Nel. And that is why I am so happy to have this ambitious, creative, and talented woman as my head chef."
