= Lafayette High School (Wildwood, Missouri) =

American high school in Wildwood, Missouri

Location
- 17050 Clayton Road; Wildwood, Missouri 63011; United States; 38°35′44″N 90°38′15″W

Information
- Type: Public high school
- Established: September 7, 1960; 66 years ago
- Principal: Karen Calcaterra
- Teaching staff: 106.32 (on an FTE basis)
- Grades: 9–12
- Enrollment: 1,668 (2025–26)
- Student to teacher ratio: 15.61
- Colors: Black, white, and gold
- Athletics conference: Suburban Conference
- Mascot: Louie the Lancer
- Nickname: (Lady) Lancers
- Newspaper: The Image, The Lancer Feed
- Yearbook: The Legend
- Website: lafayette.rsdmo.org

Lafayette High School is a secondary school in Wildwood, Missouri, and it is part of the Rockwood School District.

== History ==
Lafayette High School opened September 7, 1960, in one small building in Ellisville. To handle the growing student body, the school moved in 1989 to Wildwood. The old school site became Crestview Middle School.

== Student body ==
In the 2025–26 school year, Lafayette enrolled 1,668 students. A majority of students at Lafayette are graduates of Rockwood Valley Middle School, Crestview Middle School (only some students who went to Ellisville Elementary), and Wildwood Middle School (only students who went to Green Pines Elementary). The school serves Wildwood, and the westernmost portions of Chesterfield.

Student body composition (2025–26)
Race and ethnicity	Total
White	70.6%
Asian	10.8%
Black	8.9%
Hispanic	5.1%
Multiracial	4.2%

== Student life ==
Sports and activities include cross country, field hockey, football, golf, soccer, softball, swimming & diving, tennis, volleyball, basketball, wrestling, baseball, lacrosse, track & field, water polo, Jam Bands, Lafayette Regiment Marching Band, Student Publications, Vocal Groups, Yearbook, AFJROTC, Book Club, esports, FCA, HOSA, Jewish Students Union, Mock Trial, Mu Alpha Theta, Photography Club, Premier Chamber Strings, Racquetball Club, Robotics, Senior Women, Thespians, Winter Colorguard, Asian American Association, French Club, Latin American Culture club, Key Club, Speech and Debate Team, Student Council, National Honor Society, Cheerleaders, Escadrille, Super Fans, and Lafayette Science Council. Sports are an important aspect of Lafayette, capturing 33 state championships since 1992.

Lafayette's colors are black and white, often accented with gold.

=== Lafayette Lancer Regiment ===
The Lafayette Lancer Regiment is the school's marching band. It is a volunteer band, with an approximate annual membership of 80 people. Various staff members also aid sections throughout the season. The Lancer Regiment performs locally at many shows and participates at the Greater St. Louis Marching Festival at the Edward Jones Dome. They have also performed at shows in Branson and other places. Their 2026 show is Golden.

=== Newspaper ===
The monthly student newspaper, The Image, has run since 1965. The school's print yearbook, The Legend, is in its 48th year of publication.

== Notable alumni ==
- Robert Archibald, former NBA power forward and center (Memphis Grizzlies, Phoenix Suns, Orlando Magic, Toronto Raptors) and second-round 2002 NBA draft pick
- Matt Buschmann, former MLB pitcher (Arizona Diamondbacks)
- John Dettmer, former MLB pitcher (Texas Rangers)
- Cliff Frazier, former NFL defensive tackle (Kansas City Chiefs) and actor
- David Freese, former MLB third baseman (St. Louis Cardinals, Los Angeles Angels, Pittsburgh Pirates, Los Angeles Dodgers) and 2011 World Series MVP
- Brian Thomas Smith, actor best known for playing Zack Johnson on The Big Bang Theory
- Jeff Gray, former MLB pitcher (Oakland Athletics, Chicago Cubs, Chicago White Sox, Seattle Mariners, Minnesota Twins)
- Scarborough Green, former MLB outfielder (St. Louis Cardinals, Texas Rangers)
- Tyler Griffey, former professional basketball player (Swans Gmunden) and NCAA player for Illinois who made a buzzer beater to defeat top-ranked Indiana in the 2012-13 season
- Ryan Howard, former Philadelphia Phillies first baseman, three-time MLB All-Star, 2005 NL Rookie of the Year and 2006 NL MVP, analyst for Baseball Tonight
- Christina Machamer, professional chef who won season four of Fox reality cooking show Hell's Kitchen
- Brandon Manzonelli, professional soccer midfielder (New England Revolution, Atlanta Silverbacks FC, St. Louis Ambush, Springfield Demize)
- Austin Panchot, professional soccer, North Carolina FC
- Luke Voit, Washington Nationals first baseman and DH
