= Tyler Griffey =

American basketball player

Personal information
- Born: September 29, 1990 (age 36) Wildwood, Missouri
- Listed height: 6 ft 8 in (2.03 m)
- Listed weight: 230 lb (104 kg)

Career information
- High school: Lafayette (Wildwood, Missouri)
- College: Illinois (2009–2013)
- NBA draft: 2013: undrafted
- Playing career: 2013–2015
- Position: Forward

Career history
- 2013–2015: Allianz Swans Gmunden

Tyler Griffey (born September 29, 1990) is an American former professional basketball player who last played for the Allianz Swans Gmunden of the Austrian Basketball League. He played college basketball for the University of Illinois.

== High school career ==
Griffey played for Lafayette High School, and was coached by Scott Allen and Dave Porter. The summer prior to his senior year, Griffey was selected to play as a member of the 2009 Adidas Nations USA team among the likes of Brandon Knight, Lance Stephenson, and Derrick Favors; the team was coached by Paul Silas. As a senior, Griffey was named a member of the 2009 Missouri All-State Team as selected by the Missouri Sportswriters and Sportscasters Association and also left Lafayette High School as their all-time scorer and rebounder.

College recruiting
Name	Hometown	School	Height	Weight	Commit date
Tyler Griffey; F	Wildwood, MO	Lafayette High School	6 ft 8 in (2.03 m)	210 lb (95 kg)	Jan 31, 2008
Tyler Griffey; F	Recruit ratings: Scout: Rivals: (91)				
Overall recruit ranking: Scout: #34 (F) Rivals: #34 (F) ESPN: #31 (F)
Note: In many cases, Scout, Rivals, 247Sports, On3, and ESPN may conflict in their listings of height and weight.; In these cases, the average was taken. ESPN grades are on a 100-point scale.; Sources: "Illinois Commit List for 2009". Rivals.; "Men's Basketball Recruiting". Scout.; "ESPN – Illinois Fighting Illini Basketball Recruiting 2009". ESPN.; "Scout.com Team Recruiting Rankings". Scout.; "2009 Team Ranking". Rivals.

== College career ==
Griffey is best known for his uncontested buzzer beater layup with 0.9 seconds left to lead the unranked Illinois Fighting Illini to a 74–72 upset home win over the #1 ranked Indiana Hoosiers during the 2012–13 season.

=== College statistics ===
Legend
GP	Games played	GS	Games started	MPG	Minutes per game
FG%	Field goal percentage	3P%	3-point field goal percentage	FT%	Free throw percentage
RPG	Rebounds per game	APG	Assists per game	SPG	Steals per game
BPG	Blocks per game	PPG	Points per game	**Bold**	Career high

Year	Team	GP	GS	MPG	FG%	3P%	FT%	RPG	APG	SPG	BPG	PPG
2009–10	Illinois	32	4	8.4	.525	.350	.875	1.75	0.30	0.03	0.10	3.3
2010–11	Illinois	26	0	6.5	.333	.364	.667	1.15	0.00	0.02	0.10	1.6
2011–12	Illinois	30	20	16.5	.431	.286	.750	3.33	0.60	0.40	0.40	4.9
2012–13	Illinois	36	21	21.8	.434	.347	.686	3.47	0.60	0.60	0.60	7.2

== Professional career ==
After going undrafted in the 2013 NBA draft, Griffey signed with the Allianz Swans Gmunden of the Austrian Basketball League in Gmunden, Austria.

=== Professional statistics ===
Legend
GP	Games played	GS	Games started	MPG	Minutes per game
FG%	Field goal percentage	3P%	3-point field goal percentage	FT%	Free throw percentage
RPG	Rebounds per game	APG	Assists per game	SPG	Steals per game
BPG	Blocks per game	PPG	Points per game	**Bold**	Career high

Year	Team	GP	GS	MPG	FG%	3P%	FT%	RPG	APG	SPG	BPG	PPG
2013–14	Allianz Swans Gmunden	35	32	28.1	.534	.380	.787	4.74	0.94	0.77	0.60	14.26
2014–15	Allianz Swans Gmunden	23	18	26.3	.557	.440	.741	4.48	0.83	1.30	0.65	15.43

== Personal life ==
Griffey majored in kinesiology at the University of Illinois. He is the son of Chris and Deanna Griffey and has two younger sisters, Brenna and Taryn, and a younger brother, Trey. Griffey also has an uncle, Rich Stephens, who was a member of the Oakland Raiders as an offensive lineman from 1992 to 1996. Griffey also attended the same high school as former Illinois basketball player Robert Archibald.
