= Hell's Kitchen (American TV series) season 4 =

Hell's Kitchen
- Season 4
- Region 1 DVD cover
- Hosted by: Gordon Ramsay
- No. of contestants: 15
- Winner: Christina Machamer
- Runner-up: Louis Petrozza
- No. of episodes: 15

Release
- Original network: Fox
- Original release: April 1 – July 8, 2008

Season chronology
- ← Previous; Season 3 Next → Season 5

The fourth season of the American competitive reality television series Hell's Kitchen premiered on Fox on April 1, 2008, and concluded on July 8, 2008. Gordon Ramsay returned as host and head chef, while Scott Leibfried returned as the Blue Team's sous-chef and Gloria Felix debuted as the Red Team's sous-chef, replacing Mary-Ann Salcedo. Jean-Philippe Susilovic returned as maître d'.

This season was won by culinary student Christina Machamer, with catering director Louis Petrozza finishing second.

Filming for this season took place in October 2007 at a warehouse located in Culver City, California. It was originally supposed to air later in the 2007–2008 TV season but instead aired as a replacement for shows that were affected by the 2007–2008 Writers Guild of America strike. The fifth episode garnered the highest viewership in Hell's Kitchen history at 11.94 million viewers.

Machamer received the senior sous chef position at the prize restaurant – not the executive chef position as mentioned in show-related publicity and press releases. The restaurant opened on May 27, 2008, while the season was still airing.

== Contestants ==
Fifteen chefs competed in season four. This was the first season to begin with an odd number of chefs.

Contestant	Age (at time of filming)	Occupation	Hometown	Result
Christina Machamer	25	Culinary Student	St. Louis, Missouri	Winner
Louis Petrozza	47	Catering Director	Charlotte, North Carolina	Runner-up
Courtney "Corey" Earling	25	Private Chef	Brooklyn, New York	Eliminated before finals
Jen Gavin (Note: Chef returned to Hells Kitchen again on season 18, finished at 15th place.)	24	Garde Manger	Chicago, Illinois	Eliminated after twelfth service
Bobby Anderson	37	Executive Chef	Niagara Falls, New York	Eliminated after eleventh service
Matt Sigel	35	Sous Chef	Pine Hill, New Jersey	Eliminated after tenth service
Louross Edralin	24	Hotel Cook	Las Vegas, Nevada	Eliminated after ninth service
Rosann Fama	33	Law office receptionist & Former Cook	Staten Island, New York	Eliminated after eighth service
Ben Caylor	29	Electrician & Former Chef	Charlotte, North Carolina	Eliminated after seventh service
Shayna Zadok	28	Catering Company Owner	Buffalo, New York	Eliminated after sixth service
Vanessa Gunnell	31	Line Cook	Bozeman, Montana	Quit before fifth service
Craig Schneider	30	Sous Chef	Coram, New York	Eliminated after fourth service
Jason Underwood	29	Sous Chef	Youngstown, Ohio	Eliminated after third service
Sharon Stewart	31	Room-service chef	Las Vegas, Nevada	Eliminated after second service
Dominic DiFrancesco	43	Stay-at-home Dad	Catawba, South Carolina	Eliminated after first service

== Contestant progress ==
Each week, the best member (as determined by Ramsay) from the losing team during the latest service period was asked to nominate two of their teammates for elimination; one of these two was sent home by Ramsay. In Episode 1, the teams selected captains for service, though Ramsay changed both captains during service.

No.	Chef	Original teams						1st switch	2nd switch		Individuals				Finals
No.	Chef	401	402	403	404	405	406	407	408	409	410	411	412	413	414/415
1	Christina	WIN	NOM	BoW	WIN	NOM	WIN	WIN	NOM	WIN	NOM	BoB	IN	NOM	WINNER
2	Petrozza	LOSE	WIN	BoW	LOSE	WIN	WIN	NOM (Note: Petrozza nominated himself)	WIN	BoW	IN	IN	IN	IN	RUNNER-UP
3	Corey	WIN	BoW	LOSE	WIN	WIN	WIN	WIN	BoW	WIN	NOM	IN	NOM	OUT	Christina's team
4	Jen	WIN	NOM	LOSE	BoB	WIN	WIN	WIN	WIN	NOM	IN	NOM	OUT		Petrozza's team
5	Bobby	NOM	WIN	LOSE	BoW	WIN	WIN	LOSE	WIN	LOSE	IN	OUT			Petrozza's team
6	Matt	LOSE	WIN	LOSE	NOM	WIN	NOM	WIN	NOM	WIN	OUT				Christina's team
7	Louross	BoW	WIN	LOSE	LOSE	NOM	WIN	LOSE	WIN	OUT					Christina's team
8	Rosann	WIN	LOSE	LOSE	WIN	WIN	NOM	WIN	OUT						
9	Ben	LOSE	WIN	LOSE	NOM	WIN	WIN	OUT							Petrozza's team
10	Shayna	WIN	LOSE	LOSE	WIN	WIN	OUT								
11	Vanessa	WIN	LOSE	NOM	WIN	LEFT									
12	Craig	LOSE	WIN	LOSE	OUT										
13	Jason	LOSE	WIN	OUT											
14	Sharon	WIN	OUT												
15	Dominic	OUT													

Keywords

- WIN = Won the dinner service
- LOSE = Lost the dinner service
- BoB = Best of the Best, usually exempt from nomination
- BoW = Best of the Worst, sometimes exempt from nomination
- IN = not nominated for elimination
- NOM = nominated for elimination
- OUT = eliminated normally
- LEFT = withdrew from competition
- HOSP = eliminated due to hospitalization
- EJEC = eliminated during service

Color key
Chef was eliminated after regular nomination
Chef was eliminated after Ramsay's nomination
Chef was eliminated without nomination
Chef was eliminated from winning team
Chef was eliminated in the Cook For Your Life challenge
Chef was nominated to participate in the Cook For Your Life challenge
Chef was eliminated during service
Chef withdrew from the competition
Chef was the Best of the Best/Worst
Chef was retained after regular nomination
Chef was retained after Ramsay's nomination
Chef's nomination was voided
The winner of Hell's Kitchen
The runner-up of Hell's Kitchen

== Episodes ==
No. overall	No. in season	Title	Original release date	U.S. viewers (millions)
34	1	"15 Chefs Compete"	April 1, 2008	11.85
Fifteen chefs arrived at LAX and arrived at Hell's Kitchen, unaware chef Ramsay was accompanying them in disguise. They met Jean-Philippe and took turns impersonating Ramsay, who then revealed himself to the chefs. Signature dishes: The chefs were given 45 minutes to create their signature dish. Ramsay considered Vanessa's pan-seared halibut "the best dish by a mile", while Rosann's spicy mussel soup was nicely seasoned and Ben's mashed potatoes and gravy were deemed "not bad". The other dishes were poorly received; Ramsay called Craig's jerk-seared Chilean sea bass a "pile of shit" and "like pissy oil" and spat out Jen's Dungeness crab and corn risotto since the rice was raw, Corey's salad was described as "plain and boring" and Jason's dish as something that "wouldn't even pass as something tinned in a can". Shayna's dish was burnt, Dominic's chicken cacciatore and roasted orzo was boring and Petrozza's Cornish hen-in-a-pumpkin was dry and bland, and the potatoes underneath were drenched in butter and oil. Sharon's dish wasn't up to scratch, Christina's was based on a good concept but ruined by the "terrible execution", Louross was scolded for not doing more and Bobby for deep-fat frying his Hawaiian butterfish. Matt's "exotic tartar" received the worst review with Ramsay vomiting after tasting it. After the challenge, Ramsay announced that the winner of the season would become the executive chef at his brand-new restaurant at the London West Hollywood hotel. Captains: For the first time in Hell's Kitchen history, the teams were each told to choose a captain. The women quickly decided on Vanessa, while the men eventually chose Bobby, at the expense of not learning the menu for the opening night service. Service: None of the men knew the menu. Petrozza and Shayna served tableside amuse-bouche. While Petrozza was amicable with the customers, Jean-Phillipe criticized his slowness. Sharon served a bland risotto followed by one that reeked of garlic, and was thrown off the appetizer station. Jen took over but ruined quail eggs by flipping them over despite serving an acceptable risotto. Ramsay fired Vanessa as captain due to her weak leadership and had Rosann take over, and thanks to her strong guidance and Jen rebounding, the team finished appetizers, but could not serve entrèes because Corey overcooked chicken. In the men's kitchen, Jason and Dominic failed to produce an acceptable dish between them. Jason was first reprimanded for smoking on the patio at the start of service and not being present when Ramsay called out the first order. He then served a bland risotto followed by a burnt one, which Ramsay forced him to eat. Jason also served underseasoned and congealed soup. Dominic repeatedly binned orders of scallops in his failed attempts to cook them before serving them overcooked. Ramsay also criticized him for holding scallops in his hands, even though Jason wasn't even close to completing the risotto. Bobby refused his teammates' requests for help, leading to Louross taking the initiative and leading the others, after which Ramsay had him take over from Bobby as captain. Jason finally served appetizers, but the customers had already left, leading Ramsay to shut both kitchens down. The women were named winners for serving all of their appetizers; Louross was named “Best of the Worst” for the men. Elimination: Louross nominated Bobby and Dominic, while also considering Jason for being super slow on appetizers and taking a very long time to cook a perfect risotto. Despite Bobby's horrendous leadership, Ramsay eliminated Dominic for being out of his depth and performing poorly on fish, but warned Bobby and Jason that they had both "dodged a bullet." Dominic's comment: "Being here and being sent home first night is really a heartbreaker. I had an opportunity to work with Chef Ramsay. It was a dream of mine, but that dream was dashed." Ramsay's comment: "To be a great chef you need passion, creativity, and talent. Dominic had passion, but that was it."
35	2	"14 Chefs Compete"	April 8, 2008	11.21
Group punishment: Ramsay forced the chefs to pick up the wasted food from service and place it into cylinders. Team challenge: The contestants were tasked with filleting a large halibut into 6-ounce uniform pieces, trying to leave little waste. The women took a more slow, measured approach, compared to the men's quicker, more rash approach. Both teams had 41 pieces accepted by Ramsay, resulting in a challenge tie-breaker for the first time in Hell's Kitchen history. One person from each team had to choose an accepted fillet that was as close to six ounces as possible. The men won a 5.9-ounce piece selected by Ben, compared to a 4.8-ounce piece selected by Corey. Reward/punishment: The men were transported via Rolls-Royces and Bentleys to a superyacht, where they had lunch with Ramsay and Jean-Philippe. The women had to prepare the seafood for service. Service: Petrozza was threatened with elimination before service as he was twice unable to remember the appetizers, though he then did so with help from Bobby. Rosann and Craig were appointed assistant maître d's for service, but Craig accidentally hit a woman in the head with a chair and was forced to apologize to her, while Rosann revealed mid-service that she had only given in half of her tickets as she did not want to overwhelm the team, which then ended up adversely putting them behind. Corey and Bobby did well on appetizers, but both teams struggled with poor communication. Sharon put cooked meat and raw meat next to each other and forgot an order of beef, and was lectured for sticking her tongue out. Matt almost caused a fire on the garnish station, and Petrozza undercooked a steak and got numerous orders mixed up. Ramsay ended service after Jason served raw halibut twice, but named the men winners for serving more entrèes; Corey was named “Best of the Worst” for the women. Elimination: Corey nominated Christina and Jen, openly admitting she was being tactical in choosing people she disliked and saw as threats. After watching Jen's extremely long plea and Christina burst into tears, Ramsay spared them and eliminated Sharon for her second terrible service in a row, greatly upsetting Corey and shocking the other women. Sharon's comment: "I don't think Gordon liked me from the start. He just had the wrong image of me. But I'm not going to change anything about me, I'm not going to give up on my dream. I'll have my own restaurant one day. I'm a chef right now for a reason. I'm not going to give up." Ramsay's comment: "Sharon clearly showed great attention to detail. Unfortunately, it wasn't for her cooking, it was for her makeup."
36	3	"13 Chefs Compete"	April 15, 2008	10.56
Team challenge: The chefs were tasked with making eight perfect cuts of a chicken, part by part, without cutting too much meat or having portions of other parts on it. As the men had an extra member, Louross was forced to sit out. Jen and Shayna scored six, and Corey, Christina, Rosann, and Vanessa each scored eight, making the women's total 44. Jason scored six, and Ben and Petrozza both scored eight, but Craig, needing a score of at least six, only scored two, so Ramsay ended the challenge early and the women won. Reward/punishment: Ramsay treated the women to lunch at the Saddle Ranch Chop House on the Sunset Strip, where they unintentionally met restaurant regular and the previous season’s contestant Aaron Song. The men picked peppers from a country field. During the punishment, Ben threw a few peppers at Craig as payback for single-handedly losing the challenge. Service: Bobby was tasked to cook the tableside appetizer for the men. Like Petrozza during the previous service, Jason was thrown out before service for forgetting what the desserts were. He still could not remember when he returned and even wanted to quit the competition before finally remembering the desserts with prompting from Ramsay. Both teams completed appetizers well thanks to Christina's leadership and Petrozza's concentration but struggled on entrèes. Vanessa undercooked meat and needed her teammates to help her, but Rosann later burned the meat and started a fire in the pan, resulting in Ramsay having to extinguish it. Craig struggled on appetizers and argued with his teammates, while Ben overcooked and undercooked salmon, angering Ramsay when he blamed his mistakes on "different cooking techniques." Jason could not get soufflés to rise, and completely shocked Ramsay when he suggested coating the rims with sugar, butter, and cocoa powder in an attempt to get them to rise. Ramsay bashed his head on the table repeatedly in frustration, as that was the first step in making a soufflé. Upon receiving another undercooked salmon by Ben, Ramsay declared no winning team and instructed Christina and Petrozza to nominate one person for elimination before throwing both teams out. In addition, Bobby was scolded for waving to the diners as he left. Elimination: Petrozza, while feeling that the rest of the men would rather nominate Craig, nominated Jason, and Christina, despite desiring to nominate Corey as payback, nominated Vanessa. Ramsay eliminated Jason for consistently performing terribly, lacking passion, and not recovering after almost quitting. Jason's comment: "You know, the last girls that got put up on the block, they start crying. Well, maybe if I would have cried like some little pansy, some chick, you know, maybe I'd be back upstairs chillin' right now. But I can't do that. I'm a man. I sure as hell ain't going to cry about it. I am, however, gonna go get drunk." Ramsay's comment: "I kept waiting for Jason to show me some energy, to wake up, but he never did. And that's why I'm putting him to sleep."
37	4	"12 Chefs Compete"	April 22, 2008	10.98
Group punishment: Ramsay forced both teams to clean up their kitchens. During the punishment, Corey annoyed her teammates by going to bed instead of helping them out. Team challenge: The chefs were tasked with making perfect strands of pasta; the team with the most pasta weight winning. One member from each team was required to sit out and allow the pasta to be hung on their arms; Matt volunteered for the men, while the women made Shayna sit out. The women won their second consecutive challenge with 6.57 pounds of pasta, compared to the men's 5.48 pounds, as Craig struggled. Reward/punishment: The women won a trip to Pacific Park via a Hummer limousine. The men prepared the night's service for both teams, while Ben unknowingly volunteered to clean the petting zoo to set up for Family Night. Service: Both teams cooked a special family menu, given to them just hours in advance. Vanessa did well on appetizers, but was sent to the hospital after severely burning her hand extinguishing a fire Shayna accidentally started in a sauté pan. On the men's team, Matt served raw chicken and hard hamburgers until Bobby helped him. The women finished service well before the men due to Jen's strong leadership, and Ben was scolded after congratulating the men, despite the men being four tables behind the women. The women were sent to help them, but Craig, slow-paced, bad-tempered, and uncommunicative throughout the night, yelled at his teammates, Shayna, and even Ramsay himself before finishing service. Ramsay named the women clear winners, singling out Jen as the best cook of the night, and named Bobby “Best of the Worst” for the men for finally stepping up as a leader and helping pull them "somewhat" back together. After service, Vanessa returned and revealed she had suffered a second-degree burn and was unsure if she could continue in the competition. Elimination: Bobby nominated Craig and Matt; Ramsay also nominated Ben. Though Ramsay accused Ben of not treating the competition seriously, and Matt of being the worst performer of the night, he eliminated Craig, much to the men's relief, for his repeated mistakes and terrible attitude, and also because Ben and Matt delivered convincing pleas whereas he had not. Craig's comment: "My dream when I came to Hell's Kitchen was to get my own restaurant. I didn't do the job I was supposed to. I had a lot more to prove. I'm like, like stunned and amazed. Like, this sucks." Ramsay's comment: "I can teach someone how to cook, but Craig was a bad cook with an even worse attitude. There was no hope for him."
38	5	"11 Chefs Compete"	April 29, 2008	11.94
Team challenge: The chefs were tasked with making a gourmet pizza each before deciding which team member's pizza would be judged by Ramsay. The women went with Jen's "Little Bit of Italy, Little Bit of France" pizza, whilst the men went with Ben's mushroom pizza. The women won as Ben's mushrooms were gritty. Reward/punishment: Before leaving the kitchen to take the women on their reward, Ramsay gave the men a pep talk, saying they had talent, and only lacked teamwork. The women were rewarded with a helicopter ride and lunch at the Square One restaurant in Santa Barbara, home of the "$90 Burger" and their truffle "fries". The men prepared both kitchens for service and were given burgers without any condiments for lunch. Vanessa's exit: Though Vanessa managed to struggle through the team challenge, the pain of her burnt hand became significantly worse during prep, to the point where she was unable to work effectively. After talking with Ramsay, Vanessa decided to withdraw from the competition, as her injury was not likely to heal quickly, and she did not want to hinder her team by working at only half power. Ramsay's comment: "It's unfortunate that Vanessa's burn took her out of the competition. We'll never, ever know if she really had what it takes to win Hell's Kitchen." Vanessa's comment: "I made my choice. My team is better off without me than with me. I don't consider myself a failure. Hell's Kitchen is an immersion in fire and it's too much for me." Service: Jen's pizza was featured on the menu for this service. Before service, Ramsay brought the chefs outside and informed them that Hell's Kitchen would be serving pizzas that night. Ben was forced to make pizza deliveries in a tuk-tuk style delivery cart. Shayna undercooked a Wellington, and Rosann struggled on garnish and soon fell behind, forcing Ramsay to send the Wellington alone and ask Jen to help her. Matt struggled cooking eggs for the scallops, forcing Bobby to take over, and Louross overcooked a steak, but Petrozza managed to fool sous chef Scott by slicing the sides off the steak. Although Christina and Jen were both supposed to be on the dessert station, Jen abandoned Christina, who was struggling on her own and asking for help, prompting Ramsay to send a reluctant Corey to help her. Both teams completed service, and for the first time in Hell's Kitchen history, Ramsay declared the teams joint-winners. However, he still required them to nominate one chef for elimination. Elimination: Louross nominated himself, while the women planned to nominate Rosann, but Rosann, spurred on by Jen, talked personally to each of her teammates and had them turn against Christina, leading to her being nominated. Though Ramsay was confused by the women's decision and disappointed in Louross, in the end, he announced that due to both teams successfully finishing service and Vanessa's departure earlier in the day due to her injury, no one else would be eliminated. Although Vanessa withdrew herself, she received the picture-burning and coat-hanging sequence at the end of the episode.
39	6	"10 Chefs Compete"	May 6, 2008	11.00
Team challenge: The chefs were to prepare an appetizer and two entrees for Melissa, a girl celebrating her "Sweet 16", to vote on; the team with the most chosen dishes would win. The challenge started with both teams being each given $100 to buy ingredients in 25 minutes. The men won two dishes to one, with the tie-breaker coming on the meat entree; Melissa preferred the women's entree but, after pressure from her mother, ultimately chose the men's as it was what more guests would prefer. Reward/punishment: The men went kart racing at SpeedZone, followed by dessert sampling at Kerry Simon's restaurant, Simon LA. The women decorated Hell's Kitchen for Melissa's party, supervised by party planner Francisco and Melissa's mother Lori. Service: Before service began, Shayna expressed frustration over Ben's laid back attitude towards her challenge-winning dish, while the women were equally as frustrated with Shayna for her slow work during prep. Hell's Kitchen hosted Melissa's "Sweet 16" birthday party for the service, with Melissa and Lori as VIP guests. The service generally went well, though flaws still occurred. Christina forgot the ingredients for a risotto, while Shayna frustrated Ramsay and Gloria with her slowness on garnish. Ben served dry chicken wings but recovered. Lori returned Matt's halibut for being dry, and he undercooked another one, at which point Bobby once again took over his station. Despite his scallops receiving praise, Ramsay berated Matt for lacking heart. Rosann undercooked steak twice, including Melissa's, forcing Ramsay to eventually take over. Both teams completed service, and while the women had a 99% approval rating compared to the men's 98%, Ramsay refused to name a losing team based on a difference of just 1% and named both teams teams joint-winners for the second time in a row. However, he asked them to nominate one chef and announced that someone would be eliminated this time. Elimination: Matt and Shayna were nominated. Ramsay also nominated Rosann after asking Christina whom she would personally nominate. Matt demanded to be transferred to the women's team, arguing that he had no voice or respect on the men's team due to Bobby pushing him off his station and hoped to expose their problems. Ramsay eliminated Shayna for her slowness, but praised her big heart. Team change: Following Shayna's elimination, Ramsay granted Matt his request. Shayna's comment: "I'd be a liar if I sat here and said, 'Oh, I'm glad to go home.' No, I'm not glad to go home. I wanted to be here. I wanted to win this. But you know what, there are great things to come for me. This has shown me that I can do what I set my mind out to do. " Ramsay's comment: "Shayna has a big heart, but at times I felt her heart wasn't here. It was back home with her newborn baby. She made far too many simple mistakes and that's why she's going back to something she's good at: changing diapers."
40	7	"9 Chefs Compete"	May 13, 2008	11.31
Team challenge: The chefs took part in a blind taste test. Since the red team had an extra member, Jen was forced to sit out. Rosann identified two ingredients while Petrozza identified one, Corey identified one while Louross failed to get any, and Christina identified two while Bobby also failed to get any, making the score 5-1. Lastly, for Matt and Ben, Ramsay made a clam chowder with 10 ingredients and had them alternate guesses, with each correct guess worth one point. Ben identified four ingredients, but Matt identified four as well, giving the red team a 9–5 win. Reward/punishment: The red team spent the day getting spa treatments on the patio while the blue team cleaned the kitchen and the dorms. Ben was also called to serve iced tea to the red team. Service: Rosann burned scallops and Jen was rebuked for trying to call orders for a table in place of Ramsay. Jen became angry and non-responsive for the rest of the service, earning more criticism from Ramsay. Matt and Christina rallied the team and pushed forward with strong performances on appetizers and meat respectively, with Ramsay even deeming one of Matt's risottos to be "the best ever served in Hell's Kitchen", but Jen's attitude and Rosann's undercooked langoustine and salmon dragged the team down. Louross performed well on appetizers but had communication problems with Bobby on fish, who cooked his scallops too early, prompting Ramsay to berate the entire blue team for lacking teamwork. Ramsay also scolded Petrozza for having a messy work station. Meanwhile, Ben was a complete disaster on meat; he did not respond when Ramsay called out a ticket, then undercooked chicken and claimed that he was not used to cooking on the line. He struggled to give a time on Wellingtons and ran out of lamb for an order that arrived an hour and a half ago. When Ben's Wellington was sent back for being undercooked, Ramsay berated Ben for his laid back attitude all night and shut service down. Ramsay declared the red team the winners and praised Matt, while the blue team was told to nominate one chef for elimination. Elimination: After Ben unsuccessfully tried to persuade Bobby and Petrozza to nominate Louross, he came up with a plan whereby the team would spread their nominations out and deadlock the vote. In the end, Ben and Louross nominated each other, and Bobby nominated Petrozza, but Petrozza nominated himself, saying the other three men had worked hard and it was unfair to pick them. Ramsay complimented Petrozza on his gracious attitude, and, seeing through Ben's plan, eliminated him for his consistently terrible performances, laid back attitude and refusal to own up to his mistakes. Ben's comment: "I gave 100%. I gave everything I had. I put everything into it. You know in your heart if I'm the one for your kitchen or not. And I'm not going to blow smoke up your ass to try and get there." Ramsay's comment: "Ben left a manual labor job shoveling ditches to get back into cooking, but all he did in Hell's Kitchen was digging himself into a hole. A hole too deep to get out of."
41	8	"8 Chefs Compete"	May 20, 2008	11.44
Team change: Following Ben's elimination, Ramsay called for a volunteer from the red team to move to the blue team, which was a reluctant Jen. Team challenge: The chefs were given 20 ingredients to split between them and had to cook four individual dishes without using any ingredient twice. During the challenge, Matt accidentally cut off the tip of one of his fingers but returned after receiving first aid. The blue team was bogged down during the challenge as a result of Jen taking most of the ingredients for herself and then trying to make Louross do a surf and turf for his dish, despite his concerns that the flavors would not work. Due to Jen and Louross's conflict over his dish, the blue team was unable to plate an ingredient in time and, therefore, automatically lost the challenge. However, this was not revealed until the last round when Louross, against Jen's advice, admitted to Ramsay that they forgot an ingredient. Reward/punishment: The red team attended a photoshoot and interview for In Touch Weekly magazine. The blue team spent the day doing laundry by hand. Jen repeatedly insulted Louross for admitting to his mistake, which she believed caused them to lose. Service: The night's service included two food critics (Sophie Gayot of Gayot Publications and Merrill Schlinder of the Los Angeles Zagat Guide) among the customers who would order the same item from both kitchens for comparison, and neither Ramsay nor the chefs were aware which orders were served. The blue team managed to serve all entrèes successfully and received good reviews from the critics, with their only problem being Petrozza slicing meat too early. The red team struggled; despite Corey and Christina getting appetizers out on time and to a good standard, Matt cut tenderloin in three completely different sizes, Christina overcooked salmon and had difficulty cooking both salmon and scallops at the same time. Rosann burned garnish and ran out, causing Ramsay to leave the kitchen in disgust. Eventually, Ramsay had enough and threw the red team out after Matt overcooked meat and had the blue team finish their service. Both Ramsay and the critics deemed the blue team the clear winners; Corey was named “Best of the Worst” for the red team. Elimination: Corey nominated Matt and Rosann; Ramsay also nominated Christina. Despite initially sending Rosann back in line, Ramsay changed his mind and eliminated her for her lack of organization and many simple mistakes, along with her failure to improve after being spared from elimination several times. Ramsay then sent Christina and Matt back in line, but warned the latter that he was “on borrowed time” and the former that she would have to bounce back very soon. Rosann's comment: "I will definitely go back into the culinary business because it's a passion for me. I'm disappointed in myself but I'm definitely going to tell my daughter that no matter what happens to you in life, you just keep on trying. Dust yourself off and never stop going for what you want." Ramsay's comment: "If the size of one's mouth corresponded to the size of one's talent, then Rosann would have been a world-class master chef. Unfortunately, she just has a big mouth."
42	9	"7 Chefs Compete"	May 27, 2008	9.50
Team challenge: The chefs had to prepare three dishes in a relay competition; John Dory, chicken, and scallops. Each team had three members to compete; Louross was indirectly chosen by Jen to sit out. Only one chef from each team was allowed in the kitchen at a time, and only for six minutes. The next chef then took their place, with the previous chef having 15 seconds to brief them. Ramsay then compared the same dishes from each team on completeness, taste, and appearance. The red team scored on scallops after the blue team's were undercooked. The blue team scored on John Dory despite Jen forgetting to plate the sauce, because the red team's looked dreadful. The red team ultimately won on the chicken after Jen forgot the sauce on that dish as well. Reward/punishment: The red team went to the beach with Ramsay and Jean-Philippe, where they learned how to surf. The blue team spent the day cleaning the restaurant's exterior, the flaming Hell's Kitchen sign, and the red carpet. Service: Each team made their own menus. Customers chose from either team's menu; while it was initially announced that the team whose menu was chosen more would win, Ramsay stated that the winner would be decided by quality, not quantity. The red team collaborated on their dishes, while Jen ignored her teammates and largely devised the menu by herself; Ramsay reacted positively to the red team's menu, but was not satisfied with the blue team's and required them to rearrange it, with Bobby taking the lead on most of the dishes. On the red team, Matt declined Christina's help for her pasta dish and had numerous appetizers sent back to the kitchen for being bland, too salty, and undercooked. After he was caught sweating into the food, Christina kicked him off to go work on the garnish station where he proceeded to serve undercooked Brussels sprouts. Corey then kicked him off again and relegated him to desserts. After that, Christina and Corey put aside their differences and made it through service almost flawlessly. On the blue team, Petrozza was strong on appetizers despite being messy; however, Louross struggled on meat and had three steaks sent back to the kitchen for being undercooked. As a result, Ramsay threatened to end the service early if another steak got sent back. When Louross finally served an acceptable filet mignon, the customer had already left. Later on into service, Jen undercooked desserts and her disorganized station and messiness meant that Bobby and Petrozza struggled to help her. Both teams managed to complete service without any further issues, and Ramsay declared the blue team losers; Petrozza was named “Best of the Worst”. Elimination: Petrozza nominated Louross and Jen. Instead of asking Louross and Jen to plead their cases, Ramsay immediately asked Petrozza who should go home; the latter said that Louross should leave, as he had had the worst service. Ramsay agreed and eliminated Louross for causing the blue team's defeat. Louross's departure marks the first time an eliminated chef did not receive a walk of shame sequence. After Louross left, Ramsay announced that Matt and Jen would return to their original teams, as he felt their reassignments were not working. Ramsay's comment: "Louross was never short on energy. He was just short... on cooking ability."
43	10	"6 Chefs Compete"	June 3, 2008	9.36
Ramsay changed his mind about returning Jen and Matt to their original teams, instead merging the remaining six chefs into a united black team, the first black team in Hell's Kitchen history to have six members. Challenge: Each chef had 45 minutes to create a meal using the protein they were given. Corey's dish was named the worst as she only used a small amount of lobster, while Bobby's duck was overcooked. Petrozza's chicken and Matt's veal received positive feedback, but Jen's ribeye narrowly beat out Christina's sea bass for the win. Reward/punishment: Jen won an overnight trip to Las Vegas where she had dinner at the Green Valley Ranch Resort with last season's winner, Rahman "Rock" Harper, and chose Corey to join her. The others took in several deliveries of food. Service: The contestants would be competing as one team in a single kitchen and serving the entire dining room for tonight's service. Jen and Petrozza managed to get appetizers out, but Jen served a nicely cooked risotto followed by one that was too salty, and Petrozza served his risotto on dirty plates. The team as a whole struggled to communicate on entrèes and had trouble remembering tickets. Corey got overwhelmed on garnish and suffered a burn, for which she refused to get medical attention until Ramsay ordered her out. When one of Matt's pans caught fire, he tried to blow it out despite Ramsay warning him that hot oil would splash in his face. Christina and Matt struggled to work together on the meat station, with Matt maintaining a defeated and lethargic attitude for most of the service, supposedly due to a migraine. Christina also had a ribeye (Jen's challenge-winning dish) returned for being undercooked, with both Jen and Christina disagreeing over whether Jen had told Christina the correct way to cook it. Bobby was caught cooking salmon and scallops in one pan (which he should have known better due to having a shellfish allergy), and Christina also cooked beef and chicken in one pan. Matt served raw wellingtons and an overcooked filet and was berated by Ramsay for eating some of his food, though Matt claimed he was just tasting it. Fed up with Matt's constant complaints about his migraine and getting yelled at, Ramsay furiously kicked him out. Ramsay kicked out Jen, Christina, and then the whole team after noticing burning rice on Christina's station caused by Jen. Elimination: Matt and Christina were nominated, but when Corey said she should have been chosen, Ramsay agreed and called her forward. To everyone else's relief, Ramsay eliminated Matt for his numerous bad services and terrible attitude but encouraged him. Matt's comment: "Hell's Kitchen is a lot different than what you think. The whole teamwork thing was tough. I did my best. I'm happy as far as I came. I may be the first of the final six, but my career is not over, and it's going to keep growing. My dream came true. I got to work with Chef Ramsay. That's the best thing that could ever happen to my life." Ramsay's comment: "There once was a boy named Matt, whose kitchen performance fell flat. He was far from neat, miserable on meat. So I kicked him out, and that's that."
44	11	"5 Chefs Compete"	June 10, 2008	8.81
Challenge: Each chef had 45 minutes to teach a housewife how to make lobster spaghetti. Petrozza was easily distracted by his student's physical appearance, while Jen was threatened with elimination after twice attempting to handle the ingredients herself. Christina won, narrowly beating out Corey. Reward/punishment: Christina had lunch with Ramsay and got cooking lessons from two other chefs, Mark Peel from "Campanile" and Ben Ford from "Ford's Filling Station". The others cleaned the kitchen. Service: The dining room included a twelve-top that had to be served at the same time. Christina forgot a spaghetti, but recovered, while Jen undercooked and overcooked John Dory and Bobby served overcooked and poorly sliced wellingtons multiple times. Jen was blamed for Petrozza sending up her John Dory early and Ramsay threatened her with an automatic elimination for talking back. When the twelve-top arrived, Christina and Corey worked well together and got twelve appetizers out at the same time. However, Jen served raw John Dory, leading Ramsay to step in, while Petrozza did not serve enough garnish and Bobby had a pan catch fire. Service was completed, but Ramsay described it as "painful". Christina was named “Best of the Best”. Elimination: Christina nominated Jen and Bobby. Despite Christina advising Jen to be eliminated, Ramsay eliminated Bobby for worsening performances and failing to step up as a leader. Bobby's comment: "I do get misunderstood, because I'm 6'4". They think I'm going to try to bully my way through. They get the opposite of that, you know? I'm a warm, and I'm a joyful person. And that makes people feel so comfortable around me. I told Chef Ramsay, 'Man, thanks for the opportunity. Thanks for having me.' It came down to his decision, and he chose the general. And, uh, he-- he saluted me farewell. I walked into Hell's Kitchen with my joy, and I'm leaving with my joy. " Ramsay's comment: "Although Bobby was big in stature, he fell short in a number of areas. I kept on waiting for him to emerge, but he never did. That's why I have to say, 'Over and out, General Bobby.'"
45	12	"4 Chefs Compete"	June 17, 2008	8.25
Challenge: Each chef had one hour to cook an entrèe for a lunch service of 80 pregnant women, with their votes determining the winner. Christina's island turkey sandwiches won, beating out Petrozza's Monte Cristo sandwiches by two votes, while Jen's Calypso Groupers were third and Corey's grilled salmon BLTs were last. Reward/punishment: Christina and Ramsay visited the Lisa Kline boutique in Beverly Hills, where she was given $1,000 to spend on new clothing. Petrozza, Jen, and Corey had to clean the dining room and polish silverware for service. Service: All four chefs encountered problems. Jen served mushy risotto and was slow on scallops, Petrozza, despite serving perfect meat, had a dirty workspace, Corey served raw John Dory, and Christina burnt Ramsay's hand twice by giving him a scalding hot pan. At one point Corey asked Jen to cook quail eggs since Jen was on appetizers, but Jen pretended to not hear her before later claiming she was too busy even though she was only stirring one risotto. Eventually, Christina did it but burned them, and Jen still refused to help until Ramsay noticed the situation and ordered her to. Nevertheless, service was completed in record time and was declared a success. Elimination: Ramsay had the final four nominate two people. They decided to each anonymously write down two names they thought should leave; despite this, they quickly found out Jen voted twice for Christina. Christina, Corey, and Petrozza plotted to eliminate Jen, with Corey agreeing to be nominated purely on the basis that they thought Jen would leave. Ramsay, much to everyone else's relief, eliminated Jen for her lack of teamwork and refusal to improve her attitude but gave her encouragement. Jen's comment: "From day one, I came here banking on the fact that I would make it to the top. I don't see anyone being more passionate about cooking than me. And I know I had a really good chance of winning this. But I need to improve on my attitude. The competition started to get the better of me. This was a great opportunity, but this is the end of it for me. And it hurts. I just have to stay positive and stay strong. Do what I do best, which is cook." Ramsay's comment: "A great chef should not only be consistent with their cooking, but with their attitude. I never knew which Jen I was going to get at dinner service. And that's why it was her time to go."
46	13	"3 Chefs Compete"	June 24, 2008	7.80
Challenge: The remaining three ate one of Ramsay's signature dishes with their loved ones (Corey's mother and boyfriend, Christina's parents, and Petrozza's father and girlfriend). Afterward, each chef had 45 minutes to replicate the dish, based on taste and looks alone. Corey was the only one to use cream to bind the lettuce and the only one to use raspberry creme in the sauce, which she both got correct. However, she was the only one to use buffalo filet, which was wrong, landing her in third place. Both Christina and Petrozza correctly identified venison striploin. Petrozza was the only one to not have a pureé in his dish, as Corey had a potato parsnip pureé and Christina had a white bean pureé. Christina won, but Ramsay told Petrozza he would have won had he used a pureé since Christina used aioli to bind the lettuce, which was incorrect. Reward/punishment: Christina and her parents went sightseeing around Hollywood on a double-decker bus, which included stops at Grace and A.O.C., two upscale restaurants. (Note: This was Christina's ninth challenge win, a record that stood until season 11.) Corey and Petrozza crushed ice blocks by hand and polished glasses. Service: The final three took turns running the pass in Ramsay's place, and had to catch acts of sabotage by chefs Scott and Gloria. Ramsay also gave each chef one-on-one mentoring on running the pass; Petrozza stepped up and earned praise, Christina was initially criticized for not being serious but recovered, whilst Corey was criticized for not being severe enough. When running the pass, Petrozza failed to notice no peas in a risotto but was otherwise strong in command. Corey noticed Jean-Philippe giving her a ticket with six appetizers and five entrees, but struggled to get everyone to respond "Yes, Chef", and was late to notice a Wellington being served with the wrong sauce. However, Ramsay praised her for her strong performance on meat. Christina struggled on fish numerous times, though rebounded at the hotplate, despite Scott becoming agitated with her leadership. She spotted incorrect seasoning in mashed potatoes, becoming the only chef to notice her mistake. Elimination: Each chef had to nominate someone else for elimination; Christina and Corey nominated each other, and Petrozza nominated Christina. Ramsay named Petrozza and then Christina to advance to the final, eliminating Corey, but Ramsay praised her for her talent. Corey's comment: "I have a real problem with people that treat me like a dumb blonde. I'm not. I came in here just thinking it was going to be an easy cakewalk, and it wasn't. It was really hard. But I didn't give up. I kept cooking, I kept fighting. And I learned a lot from it. I think the compliments Chef gave me are invaluable, and I'm glad that he saw me for what I am. I did want to win Hell's Kitchen, I honestly thought that I had it. You know, the fact that I didn't, just means that there's something else out there for me."
47	14	"2 Chefs Compete"	July 1, 2008	8.03
Continued from the previous episode, Corey's jacket was hung and her picture burned. Remodeling: Hell's Kitchen was divided into two, with Christina and Petrozza getting to design their own menus, ambiance, and wait staff. As the builders remodeled Hell's Kitchen, Ramsay flew the two to New York City Times Square, where Ramsay's London NYC restaurant was located. Challenge: Petrozza and Christina had 45 minutes to cook their signature dishes, judged by five of Ramsay's chefs. Petrozza won 3-2. Reward: Petrozza was granted the first pick in drafting a brigade using the six chefs eliminated before the final. (Note: Rosann did not return, so Ben took her place as the last chef eliminated before the final eight.) Petrozza picked Bobby and Ben, while Christina chose Corey and Louross. As Petrozza was about to choose between Jen and Matt, the episode ended in a cliffhanger.
48	15	"Winner Announced"	July 8, 2008	8.91
Continued from the previous episode, Petrozza picked Jen, so Christina was left with Matt. Service: Each team served 13 tables of 50 customers. In the kitchen, Christina and Petrozza briefed their menus, but Jen had no interest in helping Petrozza and wanted to make Ramsay change his mind on eliminating her, while Matt openly displayed a negative attitude. Petrozza was a strong leader despite receiving criticism for plating the dishes himself instead of asking his teammates for help, but Jen talked back to him while serving raw onion rings, though she stopped after Ramsay accused her of sabotage. Bobby undercooked salmon strudel appetizers and eventually ran out of ingredients for two of them. Upon prompting by Petrozza, he sent up a lobster risotto as a substitute. For Christina, two of Corey's steaks were returned for being cold, Louross needed Matt's help on salad, and Matt constantly undercooked monkfish while showing no respect towards Christina or Ramsay, who offered to kick him out, though Christina declined. Despite the small problems in both kitchens, both teams finished service. Winner: The criteria for deciding a winner was determined by the customer comment cards, as well as Ramsay's observations. Summoning Christina and Petrozza to his office, Ramsay gave them his final thoughts before having them step in front of a door. Christina's door opened, making her the fourth winner of Hell's Kitchen; Petrozza took his defeat graciously. Petrozza's comment: "It's been a tough journey. It's been hard, it's been painful. It's been long, but it's been good. It's been good. I've met so many beautiful people, so many beautiful people. How priceless is that?" Christina's comment: "Oh, my goodness. Holy fucking shit. I am, like, so happy on 10 different levels. I can't even explain it. Hey, Mom and Dad, guess you don't have to worry about me anymore. I'll be okay. I'm really happy. It's almost like a fairytale, you know? I guess it really does happen to people, even big goobers like me. Mostly, what I'd like to say to Chef Ramsay is, 'Thank you for your trust and your faith in me.'" Ramsay's comment: "Christina had the least amount of experience coming into Hell's Kitchen, but I saw something in her that was quite special. She had the best potential across any other chef in Hell's Kitchen, and in my business, I think long term. I definitely, definitely made the right choice. I feel like I've been on a roller coaster for the last three months. Of all the Hell's Kitchens, this has been the one with the most ups and downs. But we ended on a high, and right now, it's time for me to get the fuck out of Hell's Kitchen."
