= Lisa Kline =

Lisa Kline is the owner of a Los Angeles boutique of the same name.

== Personal life ==
Kline grew up in Encino, California. She always knew she wanted to own her own boutique and worked in retail stores from the age of 15. She attended Syracuse University, where she studied fashion design until realizing that she preferred marketing clothes to designing them. After graduation, she returned to Los Angeles to work at a shoe store and prepare to open her own store

She was married to Robert Bryson, with whom she had two children. Her husband died in an accidental fall from the upper level balcony of their Malibu, California home in the early morning of January 22, 2009.

== The Lisa Kline brand ==
The first Lisa Kline store opened on August 5, 1995. On April 17, 1999, she opened Lisa Kline Men, which provided clothing for men and was decorated with a 1970s TV, a bar, playboys, and many other "masculine" accommodations. Kline has been reported saying that the men's store is her favorite. She began on-line sales in 2002, and launched a children's clothing line, Lisa Kline Kids, in 2003. She also owns Lisa Kline stores in Beverly Hills and Malibu.

The Lisa Kline store is featured in many episodes of the reality show Newlyweds: Nick & Jessica.

Currently (July 2024) Lisa has an independent buyer, retail consulting, brand placement, and, hospitality website. https://lisakline.com/

On the site is a recent photo of Lisa along with this statement "From the time I was 9 years old all I ever dreamed about was opening a retail clothing store. After graduating from Syracuse University cum laude in Fashion Design, I was fortunate to live that dream and open my first store at 25 years of age. It is so rewarding to curate stores that offer great style and a unique, pleasant shopping experience for the customer. Having a store is fun but it is also a business that needs to be run properly from all aspects. Now as a retail consultant with 25 years under my belt I am blessed to help others bring their visions to life."

Notable: Steve Madden, the founder of Cupcakes and Cashmere, and others left glowing reviews, some mentioning having known Lisa for many years.

There is also this article from May 2024 from CanvasRebel doing a catch-up interview with Lisa Kline. https://canvasrebel.com/meet-lisa-kline/

== Celebrity following ==
- Liv Tyler
- Ashton Kutcher
- Jessica Simpson
- Eva Longoria
- Jessica Biel
- Carmen Electra
- Halle Berry
- Paris Hilton
- Jessica Alba
- Britney Spears
- Jennifer Aniston
- LeAnn Rimes
- Lindsay Lohan
- Reese Witherspoon
- Debra Messing
- Tori Spelling
- Lauren Graham
