= Christina Machamer =

American chef (born 1982)

- Born: March 13, 1982 (age 44); St. Louis, Missouri, U.S.
- Education: The Culinary Institute of America (2008)
- Culinary career
- Rating: Michelin stars
- Current restaurant: B Cellars Winery (Calistoga, California)
- Previous restaurants: Revival (St. Louis, Missouri); Gordon Ramsay at The London, The London West Hollywood; Bouchon in Beverly Hills; Michael Chiarello Bottega (Yountville, California)
- Television show: Hell's Kitchen (American TV series) season 4

Christina Machamer (born March 13, 1982) is an American chef who won the fourth season of Fox Network's reality cooking show Hell's Kitchen. She was awarded the position of "senior sous chef" (not the executive chef position as promised) at Gordon Ramsay's then-new restaurant at The London West Hollywood, where she earned a $250,000 yearly salary.

== Early life ==
Machamer, the daughter of Rick and Leasa Machamer, was born and raised in St. Louis and began working in restaurants at age 16. She graduated from Lafayette High School in 2000 and, after some time in college, dropped out of pre-law and decided that cooking was her calling in life. After an apprenticeship with chef Larry Forgione at An American Place, she began her formal training at Forest Park Community College in 2003. She moved on to The Culinary Institute of America in Hyde Park in spring 2006 and graduated on February 29, 2008.

At the Culinary Institute, she graduated at the top of her class.

== Hell's Kitchen ==
Machamer decided to apply to Hell's Kitchen season 4 after watching season 3. She went to the open audition in Manhattan and was called back for a screen test.

As a culinary student, Machamer was the contestant with the least cooking experience and was nominated for elimination five times. (Note: This was mentioned numerous times by various other contestants during the one-on-one interviews during the show.) Despite this, she won a record nine challenges and became that season's winner. Ramsay was most impressed with her potential. After winning, Machamer had the choice of accepting her $250,000 prize money at once or earning it as a paycheck for working a year at Gordon Ramsay's restaurant.

== After Hell's Kitchen ==
Although promised the position of executive chef at the new Gordon Ramsay at The London restaurant in The London West Hollywood hotel, Machamer, as the winning contestant, was instead given the position of senior sous chef under executive chef Andy Cook.

Thereafter, while she waited for the show to air, Machamer worked at Revival, a restaurant in St. Louis started by her mentor, chef Cary McDowell.

Together with Cory Lemieux, Machamer also began BCBC Blends, a small artisan spice company they launched nationally.

Gordon Ramsay at The London in West Hollywood was awarded a Michelin Star in the 2009 Michelin Guide. As of early 2009, Machamer was the executive sous chef at the London West Hollywood restaurant, where she worked nearly 14 hours a day and was also charged with supervising the kitchen's various stations.

Later, it was announced that Machamer would be blogging for BuddyTV.com after each episode of Hell's Kitchen season 5. Around that time, she also completed her sommelier diploma in wine service.

Since her Hell's Kitchen win, Machamer has been invited to a number of culinary events. She and Hell's Kitchen season 3 winner Rock Harper competed in a cookoff, and both were among those who presented at the 2009 Scottsdale Culinary Festival in Arizona.

After Gordon Ramsay at The London in West Hollywood was sold back to LXR hotels, Machamer traveled to Napa to study wine at CIA Greystone in St. Helena, California. Shortly after, she returned to Los Angeles to be part of the opening team at Bouchon in Beverly Hills for celebrated chef Thomas Keller.

In January 2009, she was featured as a host at the St. Louis Food & Wine Experience.

In 2011, she relocated to the Napa Valley, where she found a new niche, bridging the gap between food and wine at B Cellars in Calistoga, California.

She also appeared in the 11th season of Hell's Kitchen (in 2013) as part of a brigade consisting of past Hell's Kitchen winners in order to compete against the final 5 contestants.

With the winner of Hell's Kitchen season 12, Scott Commings, Machamer briefly appeared in the 16th-season premiere of the show (in 2016) as a guest, during the red team's challenge reward (a dinner with Ramsay). She gave the women several tips about working under pressure in Hell's Kitchen.

As of March 2023, Christina owns her own catering business in the Napa Valley, Clandestine Table.
